= Alexander III Commemorative (Fabergé egg) =

1909 Imperial Fabergé egg

Alexander III Commemorative Fabergé egg
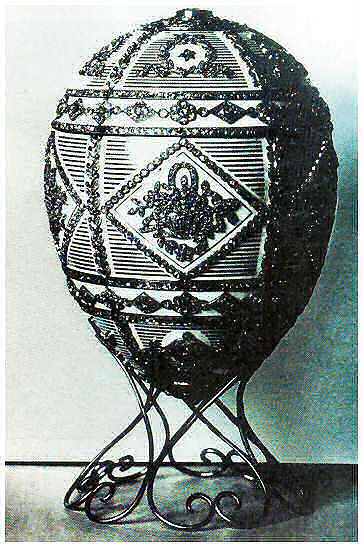
- Year delivered: 1909
- Customer: Nicholas II
- Recipient: Maria Feodorovna

Current owner
- Individual or institution: Lost

Design and materials
- Materials used: Jewels, enamel
- Height: 95 millimetres (3.7 in)
- Surprise: a miniature gold bust of Alexander III

The Alexander III Commemorative egg is a jewelled enameled Easter egg made under the supervision of the Russian jeweller Peter Carl Fabergé in 1909, for Nicholas II of Russia, who presented it to his mother, the Dowager Empress Maria Feodorovna.

The egg commemorates Alexander III of Russia, who had died fifteen years previously. The egg is one of three to commemorate Alexander, along with the Alexander III Portraits, and Alexander III Equestrian eggs. The surprise was a miniature gold bust of Alexander.

The Alexander III Commemorative egg is one of the six Imperial Fabergé eggs that are currently missing; and one of only three lost eggs of which a photograph exists, the others being the 1889 Nécessaire and 1903's Royal Danish.

== See also ==
- Objet d'art
- Egg decorating
- List of missing treasure

== Sources ==
- Faber, Toby (2008). Faberge's Eggs: The Extraordinary Story of the Masterpieces That Outlived an Empire. Random House. ISBN 978-1-4000-6550-9.
- Forbes, Christopher; Prinz von Hohenzollern, Johann Georg (1990). FABERGE; The Imperial Eggs. Prestel. ASIN B000YA9GOM.
- Lowes, Will (2001). Fabergé Eggs: A Retrospective Encyclopedia. Scarecrow Press. ISBN 0-8108-3946-6.
- Snowman, A Kenneth (1988). Carl Faberge: Goldsmith to the Imperial Court of Russia. Gramercy. ISBN 0-517-40502-4.
