= Twelve Monograms (Fabergé egg) =

1896 Imperial Fabergé egg

Twelve Monograms/Alexander III Portraits Fabergé egg
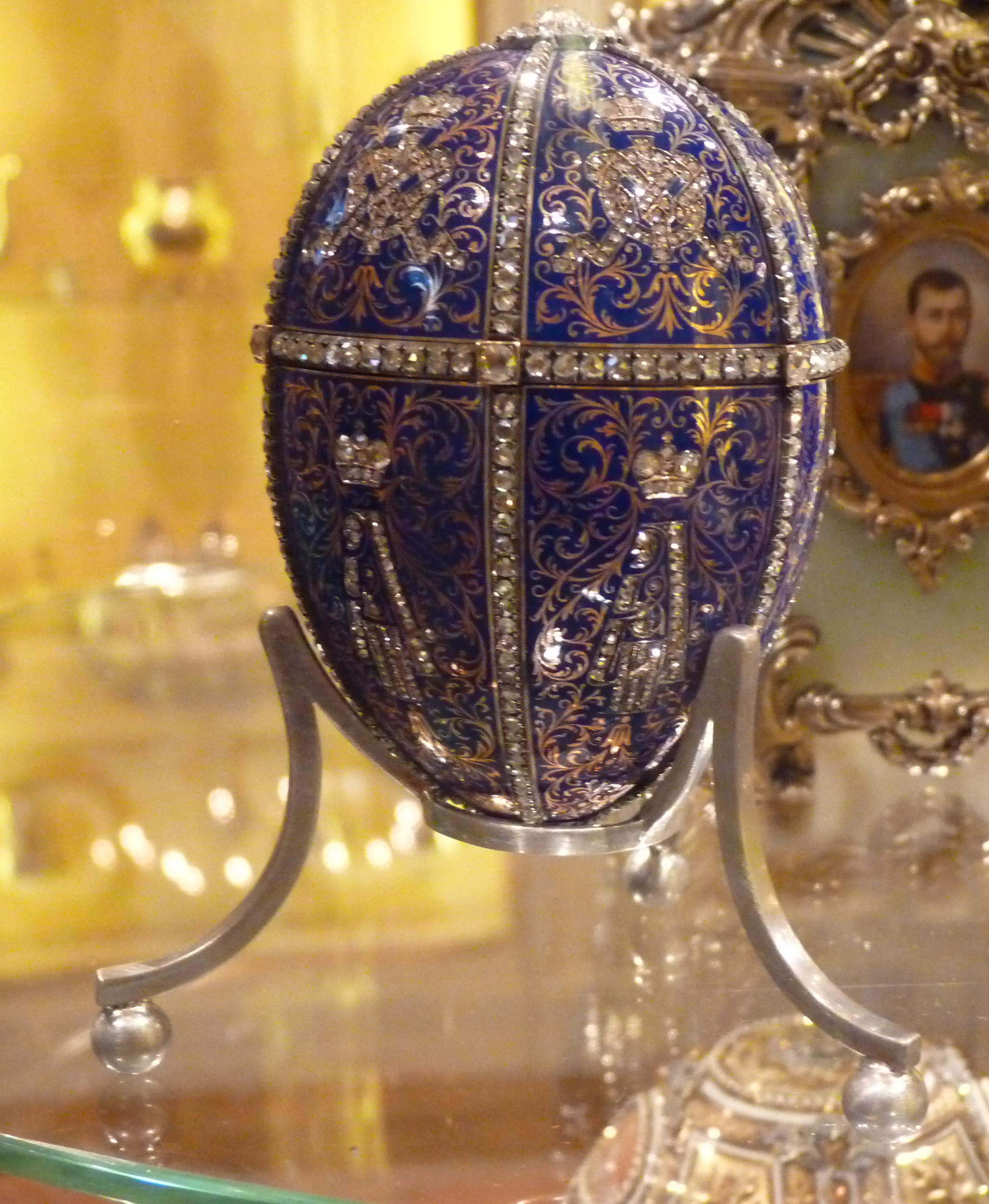
- Year delivered: 1896
- Customer: Nicholas II
- Recipient: Maria Feodorovna

Current owner
- Individual or institution: Hillwood Museum

Design and materials
- Workmaster: Michael Perkhin
- Surprise: Gold and sapphire-framed miniature portraits (whereabouts unknown)

The Twelve Monograms egg, also known as the Alexander III Portraits egg, is an Easter egg made under the supervision of the Russian jeweller Peter Carl Fabergé in 1896 for Tsar Nicholas II of Russia. It was presented by Nicholas II to his mother, the Dowager Empress Maria Feodorovna. The egg was the second Fabergé egg ever given by Nicholas II to his mother as an Easter present.

This egg is one of four commemorating Tsar Alexander III. The other three are the Empire Nephrite egg (1902), the missing Alexander III Commemorative egg (1909), and the Alexander III Equestrian Egg (1910).

It is currently held in the Hillwood Museum in Washington, D.C., as part of the Marjorie Merriweather Post Collection.

== Description ==
Each panel of the egg contains a Cyrillic cipher of Alexander III and Maria Fedorovna, set and crowned in diamonds, set against the dark blue enamel with a design of red gold, rose-cut diamonds, portrait diamonds and velvet lining. It is covered by six panels each divided by bands set with rose-cut diamonds and decorated with the Imperial crown and Imperial monograms (MF) "Maria Fyodorovna" and (AIII) "Alexander III". Each monogram appears six times, with Maria's monogram appearing on the top half of the egg and Alexander's appearing on the bottom.

== Identification ==
An allegedly-missing Fabergé egg known from its description as the Alexander III Portraits Egg was previously thought to be the Imperial Easter egg from 1895 in the Maria Feodorovna series. However, following the 2012 rediscovery of the 1887 Third Imperial egg, which was announced to the world in March 2014, and the reassignment of the Blue Serpent Clock egg as the 1895 Imperial Easter egg, it became clear that the "missing" Imperial Easter egg identified in the series as the Alexander III Portraits Egg must be the extant Twelve Monograms Egg of 1896.

The Twelve Monogram Egg is now believed to be the Fabergé "Alexander III Portraits Egg" invoice entry for 1896 describing a "blue enamel egg, 6 portraits of HIM Alexander III, with 10 sapphires and rose-cut diamonds and setting". Earlier scholars had considered this identification uncertain because no portraits are visible on the egg itself. However, drawing on correspondence between Nicholas II and the dowager Empress Maria Feodorovna, first published in 2002, it was argued that the portraits formed part of the egg’s missing surprise. In a letter of 22 March 1896, Maria Feodorovna thanked Nicholas for his “ideal egg with the charming portraits of your dear, adored Papa” and referred to “your monograms above it all”, linking the portraits and monograms and supporting the 1896 dating.

=== Surprise ===
The missing surprise is described as a folding miniature frame containing six portrait miniatures of Alexander III painted on ivory and mounted with sapphires. For decades it was known only from the invoice and was regarded as lost. However, two independent Fabergé researchers reported in the Winter 2014 Fabergé Research Newsletter that they had identified the surprise in four photographs showing the folding frame, though the portrait miniatures themselves were absent. Its last known photograph was published by Christie's Geneva in 1980, and its present whereabouts are unknown.
