= Cockerel (Fabergé egg) =

1900 Imperial Fabergé egg

Cockerel Fabergé egg
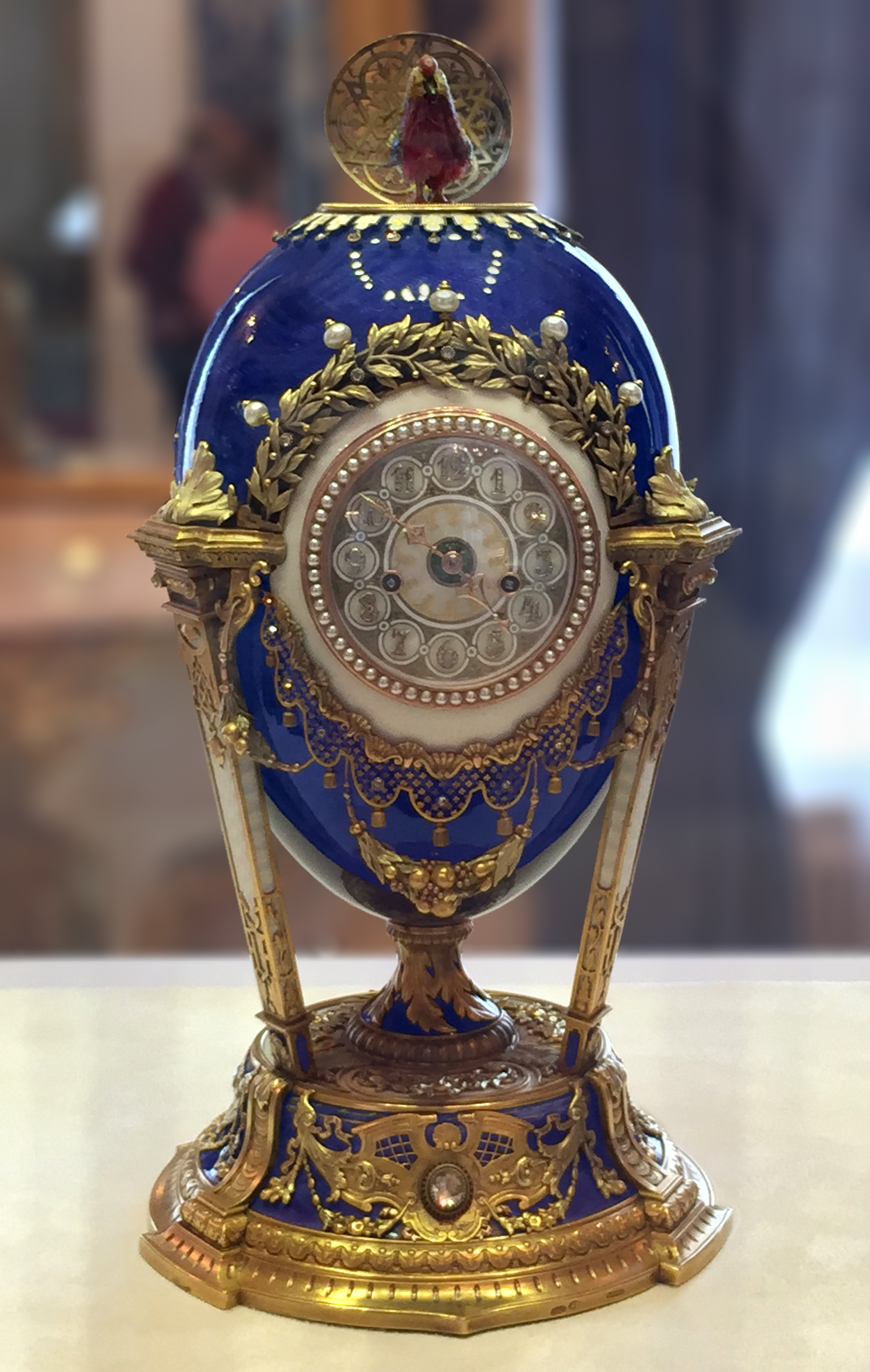
- Year delivered: 1900
- Customer: Nicholas II
- Recipient: Maria Feodoronova

Current owner
- Individual or institution: Viktor Vekselberg; Fabergé Museum in Saint Petersburg, Russia
- Year of acquisition: 2004

Design and materials
- Workmaster: Michael Perkhin
- Materials used: Gold, diamond, rubies, pearls, enamel
- Height: 20.3 centimetres (8.0 in)
- Surprise: A moving bird

The Cockerel egg (also called the Cuckoo Clock egg) is one of the Imperial Fabergé eggs crafted by the jewelry firm House of Fabergé. The egg was given in the year 1900 by Tsar Nicholas II to Empress Maria Feodoronova as a gift. The egg has a mechanism on the top rear that enables its bird to come out and move. Originally, there was a drop-shaped pearl, now lost, hanging from the swag of fruits below the dial, as seen in a historical photograph.

The egg is part of the Viktor Vekselberg Collection, owned by The Link of Times Foundation, and housed in the Fabergé Museum in Saint Petersburg, Russia.

== Sources ==
- Faber, Toby (2008). Faberge's Eggs: The Extraordinary Story of the Masterpieces That Outlived an Empire. Random House. ISBN 978-1-4000-6550-9.
- Forbes, Christopher; Prinz von Hohenzollern, Johann Georg (1990). FABERGE; The Imperial Eggs. Prestel. ASIN B000YA9GOM.
- Lowes, Will (2001). Fabergé Eggs: A Retrospective Encyclopedia. Scarecrow Press. ISBN 0-8108-3946-6.
- Snowman, A Kenneth (1988). Carl Faberge: Goldsmith to the Imperial Court of Russia. Gramercy. ISBN 0-517-40502-4.
