= Rose Quartz (disambiguation) =

Rose quartz is a type of quartz which exhibits a pale pink to rose red hue.

Rose Quartz may also refer to:

- Rose quartz (color), a gray shade of magenta
- Rose Quartz (Fabergé egg)
- Rose Quartz (My Little Pony), one of the Crystal Ponies from the My Little Pony franchise
- "Rose Quartz", a song by Toro y Moi from their album Anything in Return
- Rose Quartz, Steven's mother in the animated series Steven Universe
