= Spring flowers =

Spring flowers may refer to:

- Flowers that mainly bloom in the spring, see:
- "Spring Flowers", an instrumental song by Raffi on his 1994 album Bananaphone
- Spring Flowers (1936 film), a Chinese film of the 1930s
- Spring-loaded artificial flowers used by conjurers, that can be compressed into a small space, and which then return to normal size and shape when released
- Spring Flowers (Fabergé egg)
