= Lapis Lazuli (Fabergé egg) =

Fabergé egg

Lapis Lazuli Fabergé egg
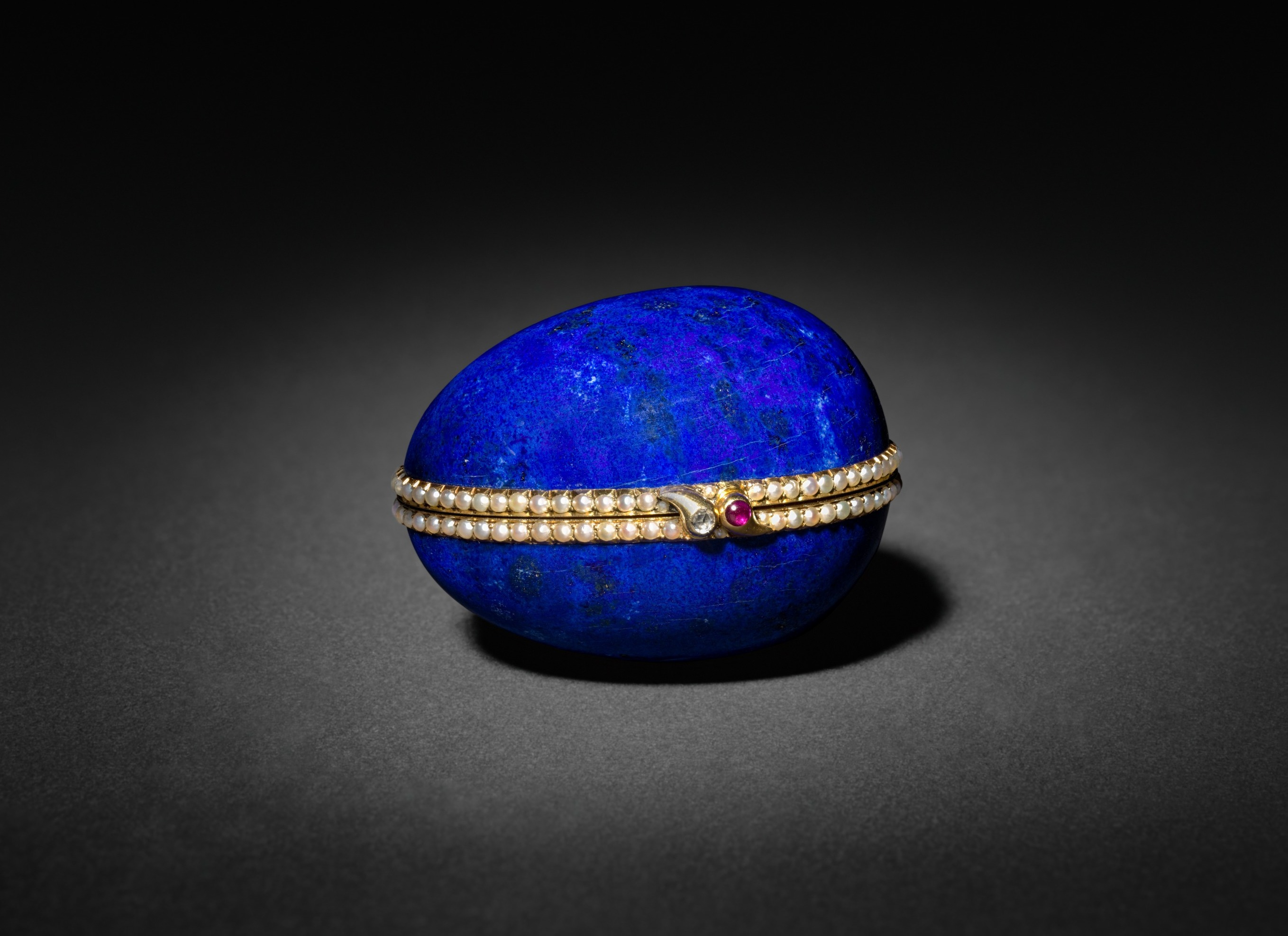
- Year delivered: 1885–1890
- Customer: Unknown client

Current owner
- Individual or institution: Cleveland Museum of Art
- Year of acquisition: 1965

Design and materials
- Materials used: Lapis lazuli, gold, enamel, pearls, diamonds, rubies
- Height: 45 millimetres (1.8 in)
- Width: 59 millimetres (2.3 in)
- Surprise: The egg opens to reveal a yolk, which contains an imperial crown and small ruby egg.

The Lapis Lazuli egg is a jewelled Fabergé egg, attributed to the House of Fabergé in St. Petersburg, Imperial Russia. Unlike many of the other Fabergé eggs, Lapis Lazuli was a private commission and as such is not considered to be one of the imperial Easter eggs, as it was never given to a Russian Tsarina.

It is currently part of the Cleveland Museum of Art's collection.

== Design ==
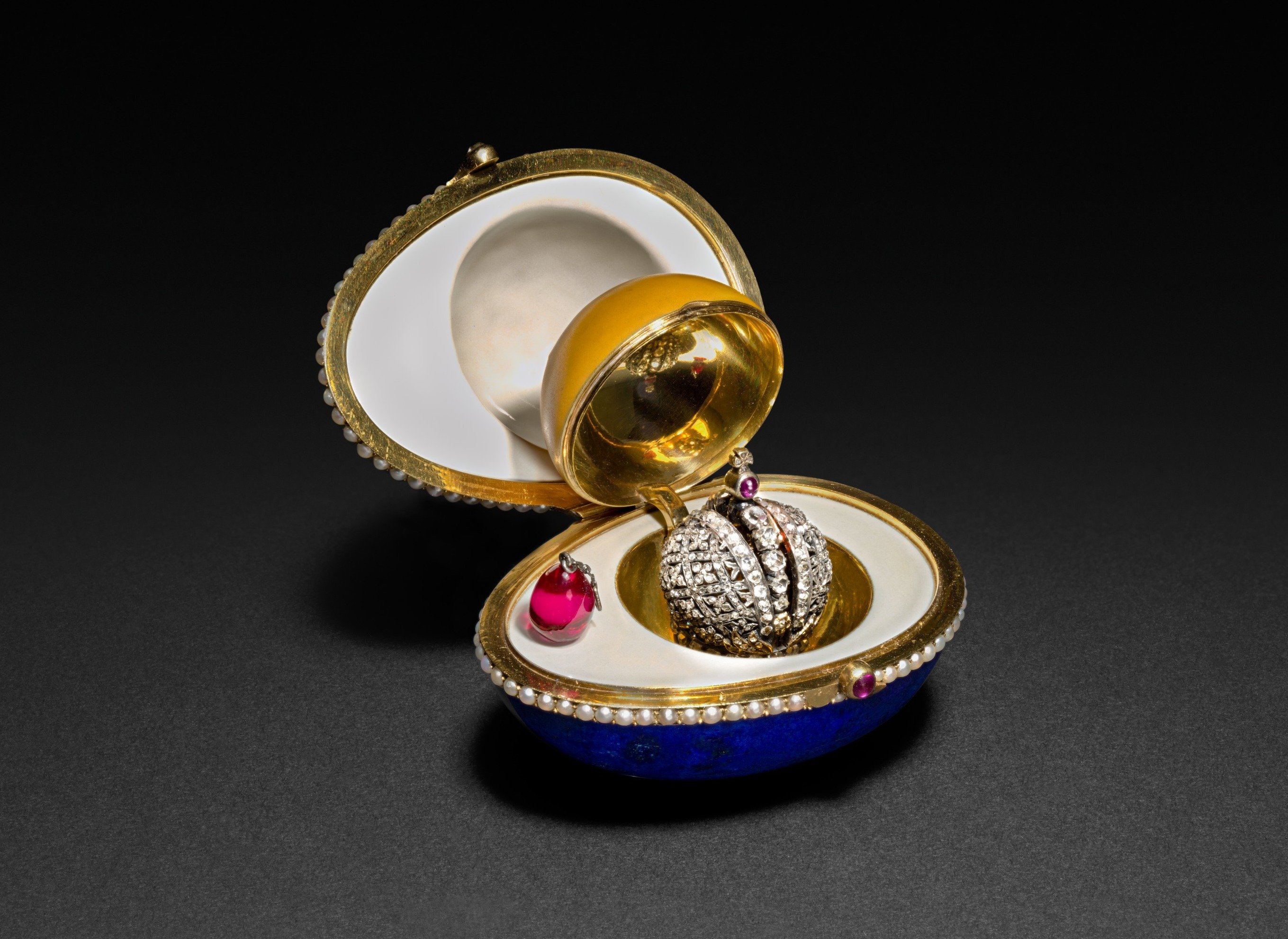
The egg opened, revealing the decorative yolk, a tiny Russian Imperial crown, and an egg-shaped ruby pendant.

The egg exterior primarily consists of lapis lazuli, a deep-blue metamorphic rock. It is also made up of gold, enamel, pearls, diamonds, and rubies. Inside the egg is a decorative orb (a "yolk") that can be opened to reveal a miniature imperial crown as well as a small ruby.

The egg is unmarked. The design is similar to the Kelch Hen, another Fabergé egg that is red and contains a similar decorative yolk with a small hen inside of it.

== History ==
The egg was created in the late 1800s or early 1900s by the House of Fabergé. The Cleveland Museum of Art estimates it may have been created between 1885 and 1890. The original commissioner or owner of the egg is unknown.

India Early Minshall started collecting Fabergé objects in 1937. In the following decades, Minshall acquired many more Fabergé works, including the Lapis Lazuli and Red Cross with Triptych eggs. Following her death in 1965, Minshall's private collection was given to the Cleveland Museum of Art, who proceeded to display over 60 items from her collection in a special exhibition. Lapis Lazuli continues to be displayed at the Museum as part of the India Early Minshall Collection.

== Questioned authenticity ==
In two articles, the first one published in September 2021 in The Burlington Magazine and a second one in the Fabergé Research Newsletter Winter 2021, it is hypothesized that this egg might be a Fauxbergé made specifically to contain the original surprises of the Rosebud egg; a miniature version of the Imperial Crown of Russia and an egg-shaped ruby pendant.
