= Napoleonic (Fabergé egg) =

1912 Imperial Fabergé egg

Napoleonic Fabergé egg
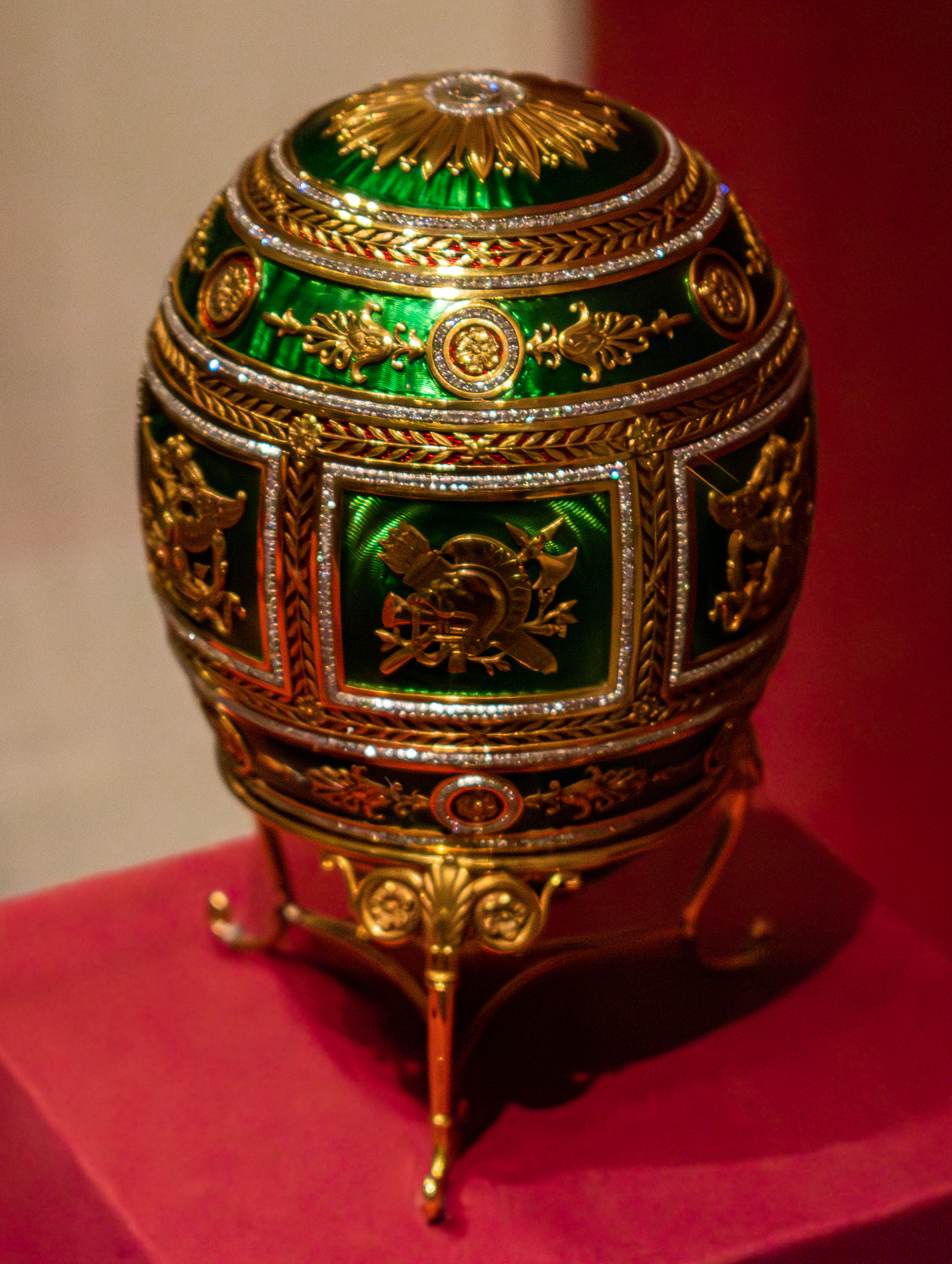
- The egg on its original matching stand also in the Empire style
- Year delivered: 1912
- Customer: Nicholas II
- Recipient: Maria Feodorovna

Current owner
- Individual or institution: Matilda Geddings Gray Foundation Collection
- Year of acquisition: 1971

Design and materials
- Workmaster: Henrik Wigström
- Surprise: Six-panel miniature screen depicting in watercolor six regiments of which Maria Fyodorovna was an honorary colonel

The Napoleonic egg, sometimes referred to as the Imperial Napoleonic egg, is a Fabergé egg, one of a series of fifty-two jewelled eggs made under the supervision of Peter Carl Fabergé. It was created in 1912 for the last Tsar of Russia Nicholas II as a gift to his mother the Dowager Empress Maria Fyodorovna. The egg is part of the Matilda Geddings Gray collection of Faberge and is currently long term installation at Metropolitan Museum of Art in New York City, New York.

== Design ==
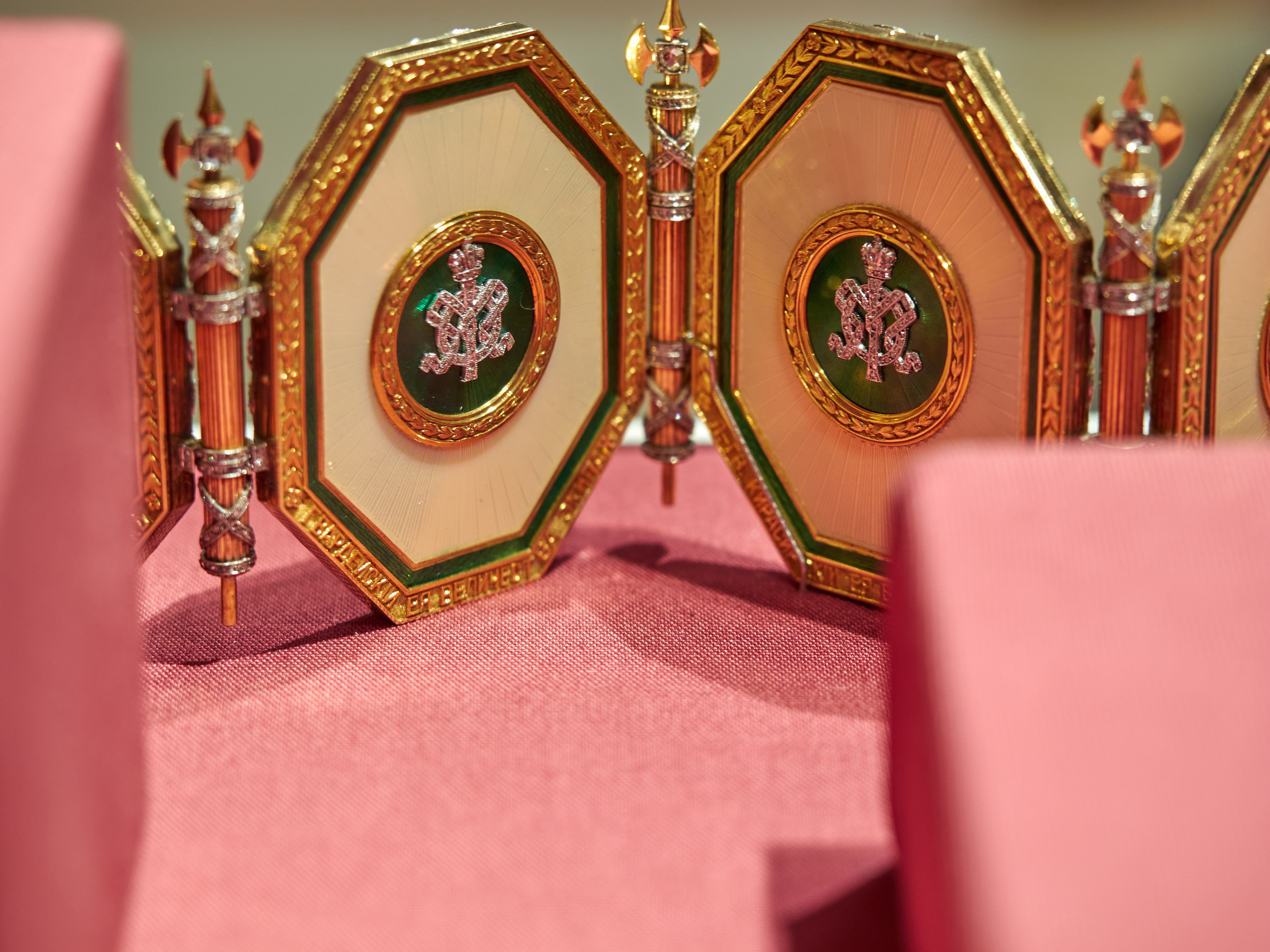
Reverse of the panels with the Dowager Empress monogram.

The egg's design commemorates the centenary of the Battle of Borodino during Napoleon's 1812 invasion of Russia. The Napoleonic egg is one of only two Imperial Eggs of which the design drawings have been found, the other being the 1907 Standart Yacht egg.

The egg is crafted out of yellow gold, with emerald panels, rubies and diamonds on its exterior. The interior of the egg is lined with satin and velvet. The egg still has its "surprise", a six-panel miniature screen depicting in watercolor six regiments of which Maria Fyodorovna was an honorary colonel. Each panel has on its reverse side the royal monogram of the Dowager Empress. The screen itself is made from translucent green emeralds, rose-cut diamonds and white enamel. The hinges of the screen are ax-topped fasces.

== History ==
The Napoleonic egg was given to the Dowager Empress by Nicholas II in 1912. The egg was seized by the post-Russian Revolution governments and was sold in 1930 along with ten other eggs to the Hammer Galleries in New York City. It was sold to a private collector in 1937, where it remained until it was sold in 1951 to Matilda Gray. After her death in 1971 the egg passed to the Matilda Geddings Gray Foundation, and in 1972 the egg began being displayed in the New Orleans Museum of Art. From 2007 until 2011, the Cheekwood Botanical Garden and Museum of Art in Nashville, Tennessee was selected to house the collection. In 2011, the collection moved to become a long term installation at the Metropolitan Museum of Art in New York City, New York.

== See also ==
- Egg decorating

== Sources ==
- Faber, Toby (2008). Faberge's Eggs: The Extraordinary Story of the Masterpieces That Outlived an Empire. Random House. ISBN 978-1-4000-6550-9.
- Forbes, Christopher; Prinz von Hohenzollern, Johann Georg (1990). FABERGE; The Imperial Eggs. Prestel. ASIN B000YA9GOM.
- Lowes, Will (2001). Fabergé Eggs: A Retrospective Encyclopedia. Scarecrow Press. ISBN 0-8108-3946-6.
- Snowman, A Kenneth (1988). Carl Faberge: Goldsmith to the Imperial Court of Russia. Gramercy. ISBN 0-517-40502-4.
