= Trans-Siberian =

Trans-Siberian or transsiberian may refer to:

- Trans-Siberian Railway, a railway line from Moscow to Vladivostok
  - Rossija (train), a passenger train service from Moscow to Vladivostok commonly called the Trans-Siberian
- Trans-Siberian Railway (Fabergé egg), a jewelled Easter egg
- Trans-Siberian Orchestra, an American rock band
- TransSiberian (film), a 2008 thriller film, directed by Brad Anderson, set on the Trans-Siberian Railway and its Trans-Manchurian branch, which runs from China to Moscow
