= Cradle with Garlands (Fabergé egg) =

1907 Imperial Fabergé egg

Cradle with Garlands Fabergé egg
- Year delivered: 1907
- Customer: Nicholas II
- Recipient: Maria Feodorovna

Current owner
- Individual or institution: Private collection
- Year of acquisition: 1992

Design and materials
- Workmaster: Henrik Wigström
- Materials used: Enamel, gold and jewels
- Surprise: Miniature of the imperial children (missing)

The Cradle with Garlands egg (also known as the Love Trophies egg) is an Imperial Fabergé egg, one of a series of fifty-four jeweled enameled Easter eggs made under the supervision of Peter Carl Fabergé for the Russian Imperial family.

It was an Easter 1907 gift for Tsarina Maria Feodorovna from her son Tsar Nicholas II, who had a standing order of two Fabergé Easter eggs every year, one for his mother and one for his wife. Its Easter 1907 counterpart, presented to the Tsar's wife, is the Rose Trellis egg.

== Design ==
It is designed by Henrik Wigström in the Louis XVI style, made of varicolored golds with translucent pale blue and green enamel, and encrusted with jewels.

== Surprise ==
The surprise within the egg is missing. According to Fabergé's invoice, the surprise was a miniature of the imperial children.

== History ==
The egg was last exhibited in 1989 in San Diego. It was sold by Sotheby's New York and is thought to be in a private U.S. collection.
