= Hen with Sapphire Pendant (Fabergé egg) =

1886 Imperial Fabergé egg

Hen with Sapphire Pendant Fabergé egg
- Year delivered: 1886
- Customer: Alexander III
- Recipient: Maria Feodorovna

Current owner
- Individual or institution: Lost
- Year of acquisition: N/A

Design and materials
- Workmaster: Unknown
- Materials used: Gold, sapphire, diamonds
- Height: 82 millimetres (3.2 in)
- Width: Unknown
- Surprise: A hen of gold and rose diamonds taking a sapphire egg out of a nest/basket

The Hen with Sapphire Pendant egg or Egg with Hen in Basket is an Imperial Fabergé egg, one in a series of fifty-two jeweled eggs made under the supervision of Peter Carl Fabergé for the Russian Imperial family. It was created in 1886 for Alexander III of Russia, who presented it to his wife, the Empress Maria Feodorovna. It is one of six imperial eggs that are currently lost.

== History ==
The success of the 1885 egg (now known as the First Hen) prompted the tsar to order a second one for 1886, beginning an Easter family tradition which would last until the Russian Revolution. A minister representing the tsar liaised with Fabergé numerous times to discuss the egg's design and composition, specifically requesting delivery before Easter without compromising on quality. The final product cost 3,000 rubles. The Hen with Sapphire Pendant was sent to Tsar Alexander III on April 5, 1886 from Fabergé's workshop. The egg was presented to Tsarina Marie Fedorovna on April 13 of the same year.

Hen with Sapphire Pendant was thereafter housed in the Anichkov Palace until the Russian Revolution, after which its survival and fate becomes uncertain. The Kremlin Armoury's 1922 inventory list includes a description of a silver hen on a stand of gold, which could refer to the egg. The description may be in error since the order specifically stated the hen was to be made of gold.

== Design ==
The exact design of this egg is not known as there are no known photographs or illustrations of the egg and written descriptions of the egg sometimes conflict with one another. Tony Farber attributes the surviving accounts of its description to both the egg and surprise.

The design is described as "a hen of gold and rose diamonds taking a sapphire egg out of a nest" in the imperial archive dated February 15, 1886 through April 24, 1886, though a description in a 1889 list describes the nest as a "wicker basket". The sapphire egg was loosely held in the hen's beak. The hen and the basket were both made of gold, studded with hundreds of rose-cut diamonds.

== See also ==
- Egg decorating

== Sources ==
- Faber, Toby (2008). Faberge's Eggs: The Extraordinary Story of the Masterpieces That Outlived an Empire. Random House. ISBN 978-1-4000-6550-9.
- Forbes, Christopher; Prinz von Hohenzollern, Johann Georg (1990). FABERGE; The Imperial Eggs. Prestel. ASIN B000YA9GOM.
- Lowes, Will (2001). Fabergé Eggs: A Retrospective Encyclopedia. Scarecrow Press. ISBN 0-8108-3946-6.
- Snowman, A Kenneth (1988). Carl Faberge: Goldsmith to the Imperial Court of Russia. Gramercy. ISBN 0-517-40502-4.
