= Fabergé egg =

Valuable jewelled egg from Russia

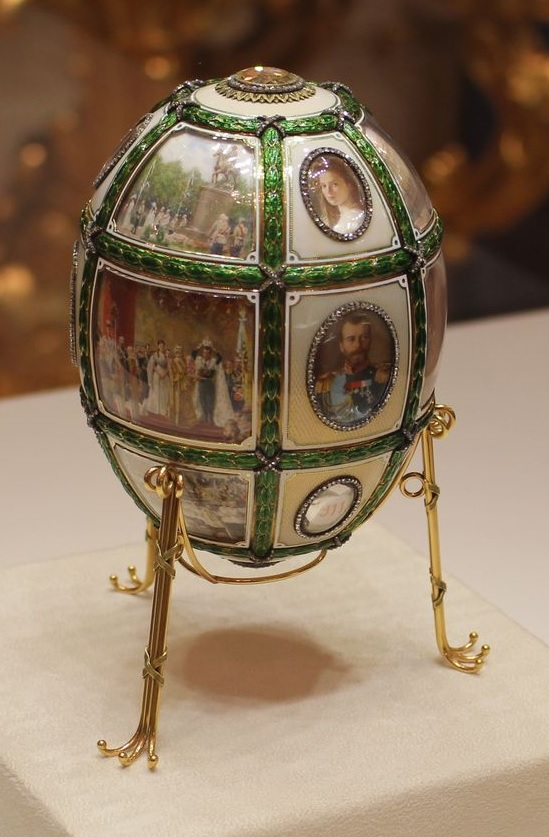
The Fifteenth Anniversary Egg, 1911

A Fabergé egg (Russian: яйцо Фаберже, romanized: yaytso Faberzhe) is a jewelled egg first created by the jewellery firm House of Fabergé, in Saint Petersburg, Russia. As many as 69 eggs were created during the Tsarist era, of which 61 are known to have survived. The most famous of the house creations are the 50 Imperial Easter eggs manufactured under the supervision of Peter Carl Fabergé, between 1885 and 1917, of which 44 are known to be in complete or partial physical existence, leaving the fate of those remaining unknown. The eggs are very highly sought-after collectors' items.

The eggs were commissioned for the Russian tsar Alexander III (10 eggs) and tsar Nicholas II (40 eggs) as Easter gifts for Alexander's wife and Nicholas's mother, Empress Maria Feodorovna, and Nicholas's wife Tsaritsa Alexandra Feodorovna. Fabergé eggs are worth large sums of money and have become symbols of opulence.

Two more Fabergé Easter Imperial eggs (bringing the total to 52) were designed but were not delivered. One egg, known as the Karelian Birch Egg, has sketches but is not confirmed to have actually been made, and the other, the Blue Tsesarevich Constellation Egg, was only partially completed, due to the Russian Revolution of 1917. In 2011, Theo Fabergé, grandson of Peter Carl Fabergé, created a series of eggs as part of the St. Petersburg Collection.

Contemporary Fabergé eggs are made by Fabergé UK Limited, the reestablished jewellery house, which maintains a Fabergé Heritage Council involving Fabergé family members.

== History ==
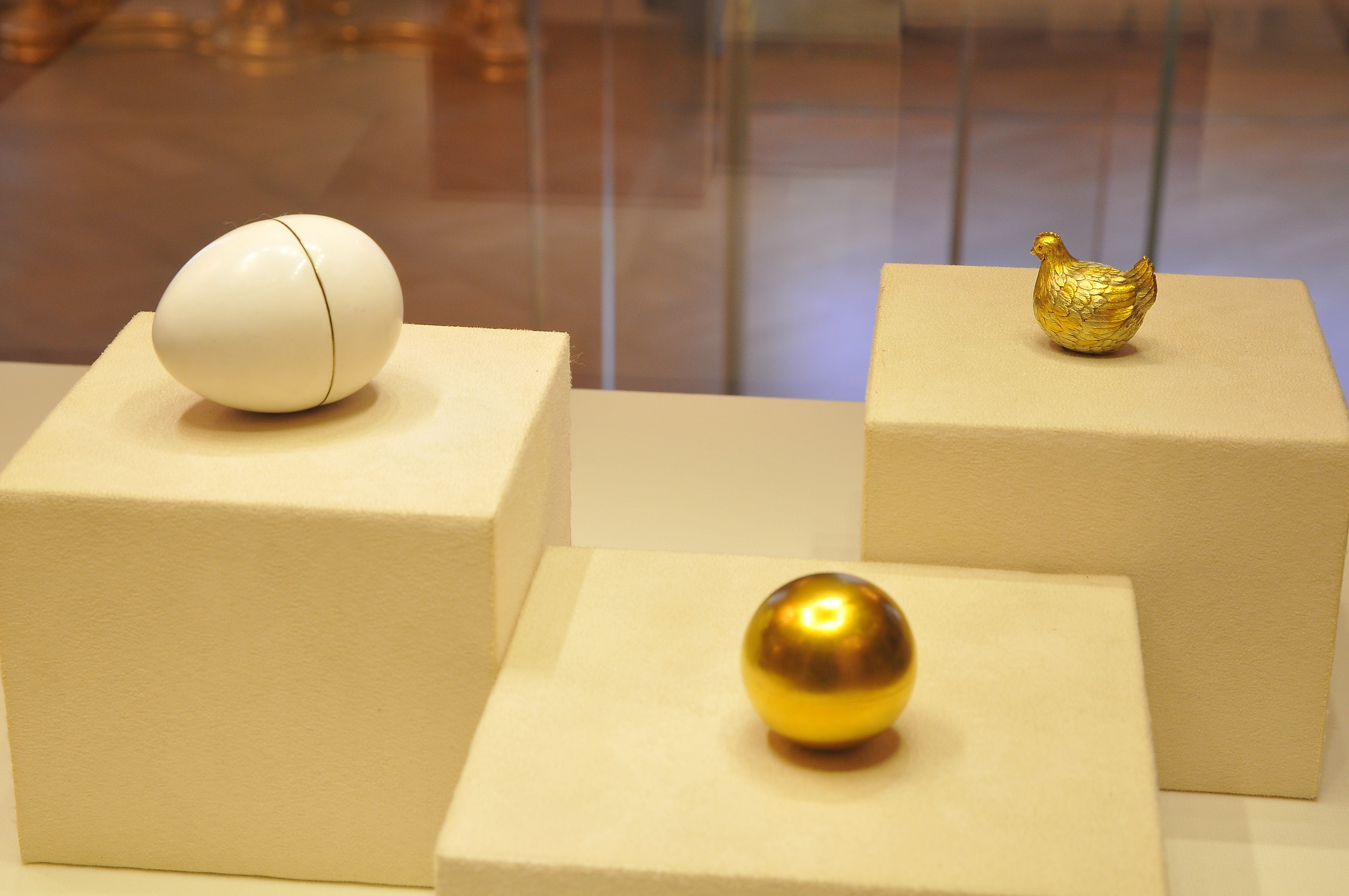
The first Imperial Fabergé Egg – the Hen Egg, 1885

The House of Fabergé was founded by the goldsmith Gustav Fabergé in 1842 in Saint Petersburg, Russia, and the eggs were commissioned by the Russian tsar after Peter Carl Fabergé took the helm, in 1882.

For Easter in 1883, before his coronation, Alexander III and Maria Feodorovna were given eggs, one of which contained a silver dagger and two skulls. The egg came with messages, including "Christ is risen" and "You may crush us—but we Nihilists shall rise again!"

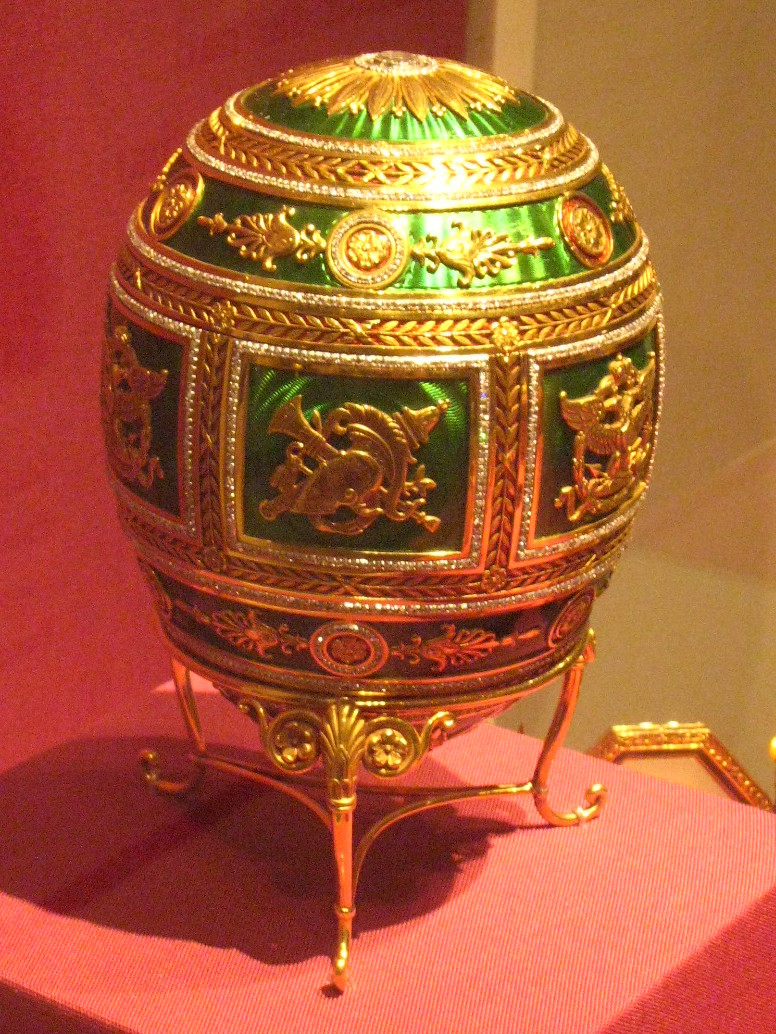
The Napoleonic egg, 1912

Prior to Easter 1885, Alexander III's brother Grand Duke Vladimir Alexandrovich suggested that Peter Carl Fabergé create a jewelled egg. This type of egg is believed to have been inspired by an ivory hen egg made for the Danish Royal Collection in the 18th century. Known as the Hen Egg, it had a 65 mm (2.5 in) outer enamel shell and a golden band around the middle. The egg opens to reveal a golden "yolk" within, which in turn opens to expose a golden hen sitting on golden straw. Inside the hen lies a miniature diamond replica of the imperial crown and a ruby pendant, though these two elements have been lost. The egg cost 4,151 rubles. Six weeks later, the emperor made Fabergé the supplier to the imperial court, following which, the egg designs became more elaborate. Once Fabergé had approved an initial design, the work was carried out by a team of craftsmen, among them Michael Perkhin, Henrik Wigström, and Erik August Kollin.

After Alexander III's death on 1 November 1894, his son, Nicholas II, presented a Fabergé egg to both his wife, Alexandra Feodorovna, and his mother, the Dowager Empress Maria Feodorovna. Records have shown that of the 50 Imperial Easter eggs, 20 were given to the former and 30 to the latter. Eggs were made each year except 1904 and 1905, during the Russo-Japanese War.

The imperial eggs enjoyed great fame. Fabergé was commissioned to make similar eggs for a few private clients, including the Duchess of Marlborough, the Rothschild family, and the Yusupovs. He was also commissioned to make twelve eggs for the industrialist Alexander Kelch, though only seven appear to have been completed. Following the revolution and the nationalisation of the Fabergé workshop in Saint Petersburg by the Bolsheviks in 1918, the Fabergé family left Russia. Their trademark was sold several times, and different companies retailed merchandise using the Fabergé name. From 1998 to 2009, the Victor Mayer jewellery company produced Fabergé eggs under Unilever's license.

== Art of surprise ==
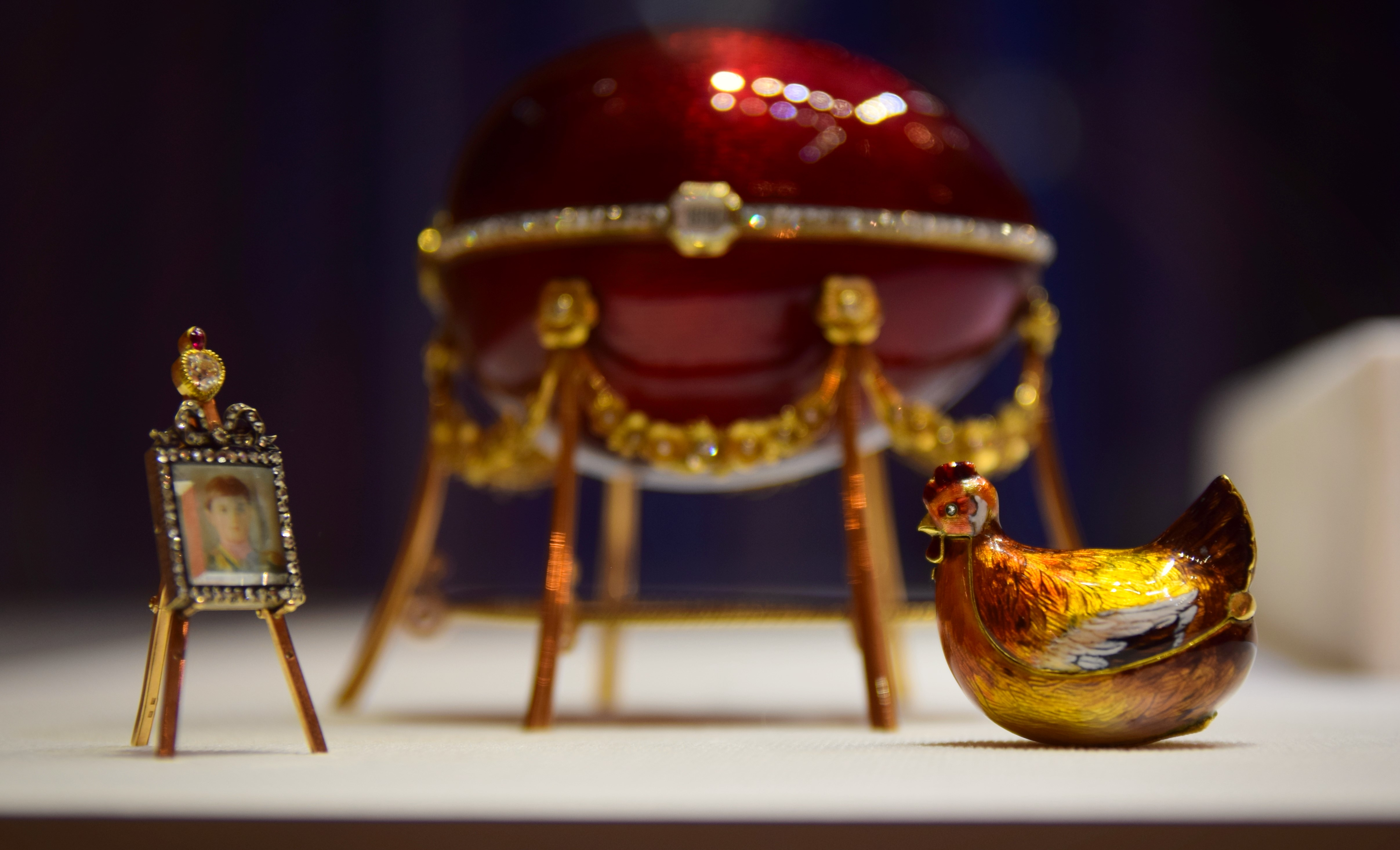
Kelch Hen Fabergé egg with surprises

Every Fabergé egg embodied a story and a surprise. The Hen Egg (1885) opened to reveal a golden egg and hen. The Rosebud Egg (1895) was the first egg made for Alexandra Fedorovna, wife of Tsar Nicholas II, and featured a yellow rose, believed to be the most noble colour, a miniature jewelled crown, and a ruby pendant (both missing).

The Danish Palace Egg (1890) contained a folding ten-panel screen depicting the Danish Imperial yacht Polar Star, Amaliensborg Palace, the estate of Hvidøre, Fredensborg Palace, Bernsdorff Castle, Kronberg Castle, two views of Cottage Palace in Copenhagen, and Catching Palace, St Petersburg.

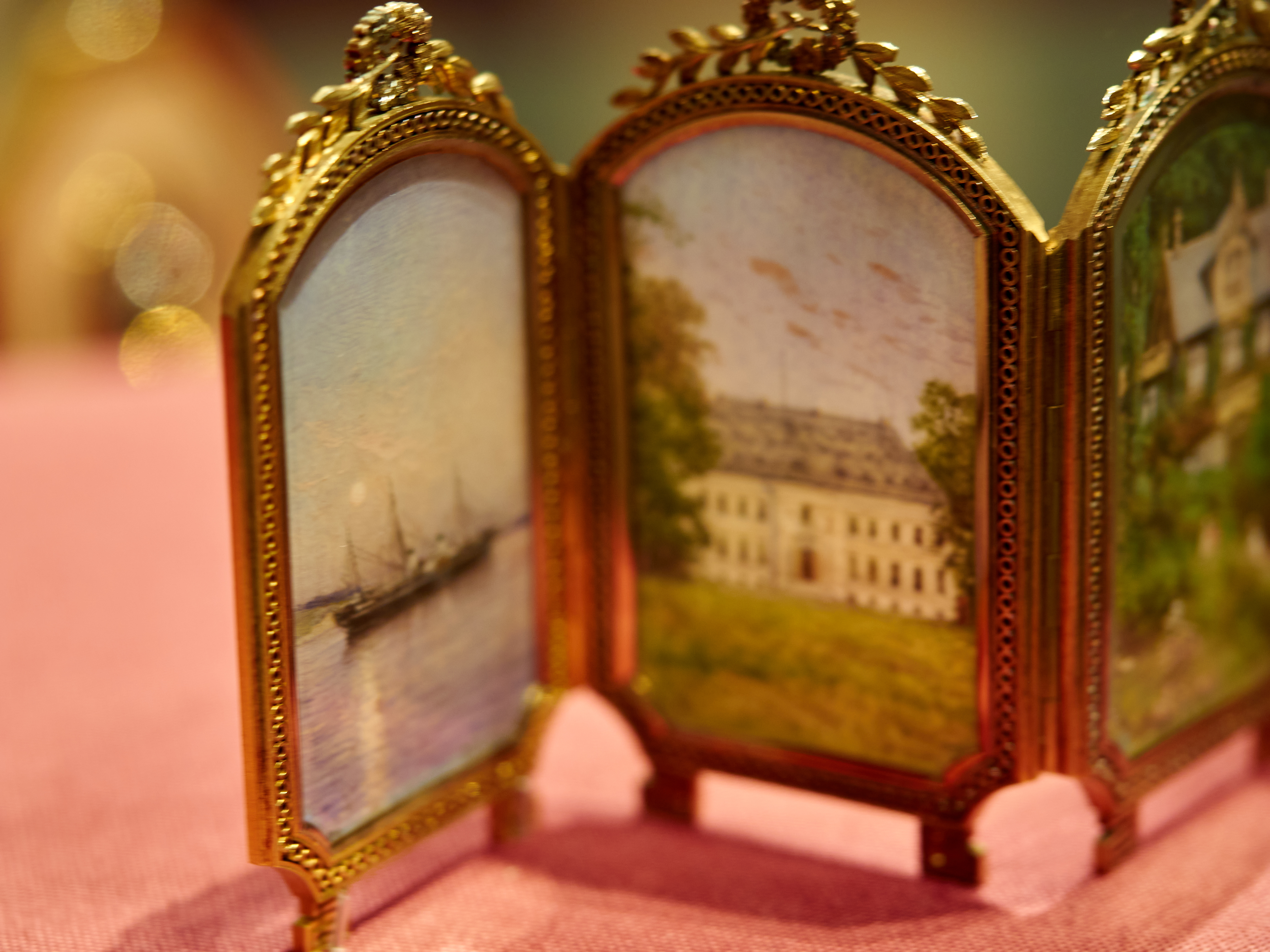
Danish Palaces Egg surprise foldout frame, 1890

Techniques such as guilloché enamelling were introduced by Fabergé, and quality was overseen and approved by Peter Carl himself, or in his absence, by his eldest son Eugène, before it was placed into stock. The smallest of faults would result in rejection.

== Fabergé eggs since 2007 ==
The Fabergé trademarks were consolidated in 2007 and are owned by Fabergé UK Limited, which makes luxury fine jewellery. Among their 21st-century collaborations was a series of pieces celebrating the 007 archive, which included the "007 Octopussy" capsule collection, inspired by the 1983 James Bond film, Octopussy.

In December 2023, Fabergé debuted "Journey in Jewels" on the Seven Seas Grandeur, a luxury cruise ship from Regent Seven Seas Cruises.

== List of eggs ==
=== List of Fabergé Imperial Easter eggs ===
Below is a chronology of the 52 eggs made for the imperial family. The dating of the eggs has evolved. An earlier chronology dated the Blue Serpent Clock Egg to 1887 and identified the 1895 egg as the Twelve Monograms Egg. The discovery of the previously lost Third Imperial Easter Egg confirms the chronology below.

Date	Egg	Image	Description	Owner
1885	First Hen		Also known as the Jewelled Hen Egg, it was the first in a series of 54 jewelled eggs made for the Russian imperial family under Fabergé's supervision. It was delivered to Alexander III in 1885. The Tsarina and the Tsar enjoyed the egg so much that Alexander III ordered a new one from Fabergé for his wife every Easter thereafter.	Viktor Vekselberg
1886	Hen with Sapphire Pendant		Also known as the Egg with Hen in Basket, it was made in 1886 for Alexander III, who presented it to his wife, the Empress Maria Feodorovna. This 1902 photograph shows Fabergé Imperial Easter eggs belonging to the Dowager Empress Maria Feodorovna and the Empress Alexandra Feodorovna. It is possible that Hen with Sapphire Pendant is among the Fabergé eggs in this picture.	Lost
1887	Third Imperial		A jewelled and ridged yellow–gold egg with Vacheron Constantin watch stands on its original tripod pedestal, which has chased lion paw feet and is encircled by coloured gold garlands suspended from cabochon blue sapphires topped with rose diamond set bows. It resurfaced at an American flea market, where it was purchased around 2004 by a dealer, who, not knowing its true value, attempted to sell it but failed. The dealer eventually looked up the egg online in 2012 and had its identity confirmed by the London-based jeweller Wartski, who purchased it on behalf of an unidentified private collector.	Private collection
1888	Cherub with Chariot		Also known as the Angel with Egg in Chariot, it was crafted and delivered in 1888 to Alexander III. This is one of the lost Imperial eggs. Few details are known about it. The second image is computer-generated, based on available descriptions of the egg.	Lost
1889	Nécessaire		Crafted and delivered to Alexander III, who presented it to his wife, Maria Feodorovna, on Easter 1889. Sold in 1952	Private collection, details unknown
1890	Danish Palaces		Alexander III presented it to his wife, Maria Feodorovna, on Easter 1890.	Matilda Geddings Gray Foundation, housed in the Metropolitan Museum of Art, New York City, until 2021
1891	Memory of Azov			Kremlin Armoury, Moscow, Russia
1892	Diamond Trellis		The surprise, an elephant automaton thought to have been lost for many years, was identified in 2015 as being in the collection of the British Royal Collection Trust.	Dorothy and Artie McFerrin collection, US
1893	Caucasus			Matilda Geddings Gray Foundation, displayed in the Metropolitan Museum of Art, New York City
1894	Renaissance		One theory is that the surprise is part of another Fabergé egg, the Resurrection, which perfectly fits the curvature of the Renaissance egg's shell and has a similar decoration in enamel on the base.	Viktor Vekselberg
1895	Rosebud			Viktor Vekselberg
1895	Blue Serpent Clock		Before March 2014, it was mistaken for the Third Imperial egg.	Albert II of Monaco collection, Monte Carlo, Monaco
1896	Rock Crystal		Also known as the Revolving Miniatures Egg	Virginia Museum of Fine Arts, Richmond, Virginia, US
1896	Twelve Monograms		Also known as the Alexander III Portraits egg. Surprise is missing.	Hillwood Museum, Washington, D.C., US
1897	Imperial Coronation			Viktor Vekselberg
1897	Mauve		Only the egg's surprise (pictured) has been found.	Lost; Viktor Vekselberg
1898	Lilies of the Valley		Made under the supervision of Fabergé in 1898 by Fabergé ateliers. The supervising goldsmith was Michael Perchin. The egg is one of two in the Art Nouveau style. It was presented on 5 April to Tsar Nicholas II and given to his wife, Alexandra Fyodorovna.	Viktor Vekselberg
1898	Pelican			Virginia Museum of Fine Arts, Richmond, Virginia, US
1899	Bouquet of Lilies Clock			Kremlin Armoury, Moscow, Russia
1899	Pansy		Also known as the Spinach Jade Egg, made by Fabergé in 1899 for Tsar Nicholas II and given to Empress Maria Feodoronova as a gift. The egg has a mechanism that when pressed will allow the heart inside to open up as a pendant containing pictures of family members. Made of nephrite, silver-gilt, diamonds, white, red, green, and opaque violet enamel. Heart surprise made of varicoloured gold, diamonds, pearls, enamel, and mother-of-pearl.	Matilda Gray Stream, US
1900	Trans-Siberian Railway			Kremlin Armoury, Moscow, Russia
1900	Cockerel			Viktor Vekselberg
1901	Basket of Flowers			Royal Collection, London, United Kingdom
1901	Gatchina Palace			Walters Art Museum, Baltimore, Maryland, US
1902	Clover Leaf			Kremlin Armoury, Moscow, Russia
1902	Empire Nephrite		Probably a Fauxbergé	Private collection, New York City
1903	Peter the Great			Virginia Museum of Fine Arts, Richmond, Virginia, US
1903	Royal Danish			Lost
1906	Moscow Kremlin			Kremlin Armoury, Moscow, Russia
1906	Swan			Edouard and Maurice Sandoz Foundation, Switzerland
1907	Rose Trellis			Walters Art Museum, Baltimore, Maryland, US
1907	Cradle with Garlands		Also known as the "Love Trophies" egg	Private collection, Robert M. Lee, US
1908	Alexander Palace			Kremlin Armoury, Moscow, Russia
1908	Peacock		The Peacock egg is a jewel and rock crystal Easter egg made by Dorofeiev under the supervision of the Russian jeweller Peter Carl Fabergé in 1908. It was made for Nicholas II of Russia, who presented the egg to his mother, the Dowager Empress Maria Feodorovna, in 1908. The transparent egg is composed of rock crystal and gilt silver wire and is quite simple in style. The genius of the egg lay in its surprise: the egg is held together by a clasp at the top, and when opened, falls into two halves, each with a rococo-style mount.	Edouard and Maurice Sandoz Foundation, Switzerland
1909	Standart Yacht			Kremlin Armoury, Moscow, Russia
1909	Alexander III Commemorative			Lost
1910	Colonnade			Royal Collection, London, UK
1910	Alexander III Equestrian			Kremlin Armoury, Moscow, Russia
1911	Fifteenth Anniversary			Viktor Vekselberg
1911	Bay Tree		Also known as the Orange Tree egg.	Viktor Vekselberg
1912	Tsarevich			Virginia Museum of Fine Arts, Richmond, Virginia, US
1912	Napoleonic			Matilda Geddings Gray Foundation. Displayed at the Metropolitan Museum of Art, New York City
1913	Romanov Tercentenary			Kremlin Armoury, Moscow, Russia
1913	Winter		Designed by Alma Pihl, the only female and one of the best-known Fabergé workmasters, as a gift to Maria Feodorovna by her son Nicholas II. The exterior of the egg resembles frost and ice crystals formed on clear glass. It is studded with 1,660 diamonds and is made from quartz, platinum, and orthoclase. The surprise is a miniature flower basket studded with 1,378 diamonds and is made from platinum and gold, while the flowers are made of white quartz and the leaves of demantoid. The flowers lie in gold moss. The egg is 102 millimetres high.	It was reported that the buyer was Hamad bin Khalifa Al Thani, the Emir of Qatar.
1914	Mosaic			Royal Collection, London, UK
1914	Catherine the Great		Also known as the "Grisaille". The egg was made by Henrik Wigström, "Fabergé's last head workmaster". It was given to Maria Feodorovna by her son Nicholas II. Its surprise (now lost) was "a mechanical sedan chair, carried by two blackamoors, with Catherine the Great seated inside".	Hillwood Museum, Washington, D.C., US
1915	Red Cross with Triptych			Cleveland Museum of Art, Cleveland, Ohio, US
1915	Red Cross with Imperial Portraits			Virginia Museum of Fine Arts, Richmond, Virginia, US
1916	Steel Military			Kremlin Armoury, Moscow, Russia
1916	Order of St. George		Made during World War I, the Order of St. George egg commemorates the Order of St. George that was awarded to Emperor Nicholas and his son, the Grand Duke Alexei Nikolaievich. The Order of St. George Egg and its counterpart, the Steel Military Egg, were of modest design, in keeping with the austerity of World War I, and Fabergé billed 13,347 rubles for the two. The Order of St. George egg left Bolshevik Russia with its original recipient, the Dowager Empress Maria Feodorovna.	Viktor Vekselberg
1917	Karelian Birch		Because of the 1917 February Revolution and subsequent events, this egg was never finished or presented to Nicholas's mother, Maria Feodorovna.	Lost
1917	Constellation		Because of the 1917 February Revolution and subsequent events, this egg was never finished or presented to Nicholas's wife, Alexandra Feodorovna.	Fersman Mineralogical Museum, Moscow, Russia

=== List of Kelch eggs ===
Fabergé was also commissioned to make eggs for Alexander Ferdinandovich Kelch, a Siberian gold mine industrialist, as gifts for his wife Barbara (Varvara) Kelch-Bazanova. Though still "Fabergé eggs" by virtue of having been produced by his workshop, these seven eggs were not as elaborate as the imperial eggs and were not unique in design. Most are copies of other eggs.

Date	Egg	Image	Description	Owner
1898	Kelch Hen			Viktor Vekselberg
1899	Twelve Panel			Royal Collection, London, UK
1900	Pine Cone			Private collection
1901	Apple Blossom			Liechtenstein National Museum
1902	Rocaille			Dorothy and Artie McFerrin collection
1903	Bonbonnière			Kerry Packer estate
1904	Chanticleer			Viktor Vekselberg

=== Other Fabergé eggs ===
Date	Egg	Image	Description	Owner
1885–1889	Resurrection		Almost certainly the surprise from the 1894 Renaissance Egg	Viktor Vekselberg
1885–1891	Blue Striped Enamel			Private collection
1885–1890	Lapis Lazuli		Possibly a Fauxbergé; however, the two surprises most likely belong to the Rosebud egg.	Cleveland Museum of Art
1899	Rose Quartz			Private collection
1899–1903	Spring Flowers		Possibly a Fauxbergé	Viktor Vekselberg
1899–1903	Scandinavian			Viktor Vekselberg
1902	Duchess of Marlborough			Viktor Vekselberg
1902	Rothschild			Hermitage Museum, Saint Petersburg, Russia
1903	Clock			Private collection
1907	Yusupov		Louis XVI style. Given to Zinaida Yusupova (7th princess of Yusupovs) by Felix Felixovich Sumarokov-Elston. The egg was left in a vault in Russia when the princess fled the Bolshevik revolution, but it was found and sold by Russian officials. Maurice Yves Sandoz bought it in 1953 (hence the "M, Y, S" engraved in the egg's medallions). On display at the Musée d'Horlogerie du Locle in Locle, Switzerland.	Sandoz Foundation (since 1995)
1914	Nobel's Ice Egg			Dorothy and Artie McFerrin collection
1917	Twilight			Private collection

== Location of eggs ==
Of the 52 known Fabergé eggs, (Note: the 50 delivered Imperial eggs, the Karelian Birch Egg, the seven Kelch eggs, the Duchess of Marlborough, the Rothschild, the Youssoupov, Nobel, Resurrection, Spring Flowers, and Blue Striped Enamel eggs—total 65) 46 have survived to the present day. Ten of the imperial Easter eggs are displayed at Moscow's Kremlin Armory Museum. Of the 50 delivered imperial eggs, 44 have survived, and there are photographs of three of the six lost eggs: the 1903 Royal Danish Egg, the 1909 Alexander III Commemorative Egg, and the Nécessaire Egg of 1889. The previously lost Third Imperial Easter Egg of 1887 has since been found in the US and bought by Wartski for a private collector. All six of the missing Imperial Eggs belonged to Maria Feodorovna.

After the Russian Revolution, the Bolsheviks nationalised the House of Fabergé, and the Fabergé family fled to Switzerland, where Peter Carl Fabergé died in 1920. The imperial family's palaces were ransacked and their treasures moved to the Kremlin Armoury on order of Vladimir Lenin.

In a bid to acquire more foreign currency, Joseph Stalin had many of the eggs sold in 1927, after their value had been appraised by Agathon Carl Theodor Fabergé. Between 1930 and 1933, 14 imperial eggs left Russia. Many were sold to Armand Hammer (president of Occidental Petroleum and a personal friend of Lenin, whose father was founder of the United States Communist Party) and to Emanuel Snowman of the London antique dealers Wartski.

After the collection in the Kremlin Armoury, the largest gathering of Fabergé eggs was assembled by Malcolm Forbes and displayed in New York City. Totalling nine eggs and approximately 180 other Fabergé objects, the collection was to be put up for auction at Sotheby's in February 2004 by Forbes' heirs. However, before the auction began, the collection was purchased in its entirety by the oligarch Viktor Vekselberg. In a 2013 BBC Four documentary, Vekselberg revealed he had spent just over US$100 million purchasing the nine Fabergé eggs. He claims never to have displayed them in his home, saying he bought them as they are important to Russian history and culture, and he believed them to be the best jewellery art in the world. In the same BBC documentary, Vekselberg revealed his plan to open a museum that would display the eggs in his collection, which was built as a private Fabergé Museum in Saint Petersburg, Russia on 19 November 2013. (Note: The foundation supporting the Fabergé Museum in Saint Petersburg is the Link of Times Foundation, which has repatriated lost cultural valuables to Russia.)

In November 2007, a Fabergé clock, named by Christie's auction house as the Rothschild Egg, sold at auction for £8.9 million (US$16.5 million) (including commission). The price achieved by the egg set three auction records: it is the most expensive timepiece, Russian object, and Fabergé object ever sold at auction, surpassing the US$9.6 million sale of the 1913 Winter Egg in 2002. On 2 December 2025, the Winter Egg was sold at Christie's for £23 million.

In 1989, as part of the San Diego Arts Festival, 26 Fabergé eggs were loaned for display at the San Diego Museum of Art, the largest exhibition of Fabergé eggs anywhere since the Russian Revolution. The eggs included eight from the Kremlin, (Note: Memory of Azov, Bouquet of Lilies Clock, Trans-Siberian Railway, Alexander Palace, Standart Yacht, Alexander III Equestrian, Romanov Tercentenary, and Steel Military) nine from the Forbes collection, (Note: Renaissance, Rosebud, Coronation, Lilies of the Valley, Cockerel, Bay Tree, Fifteenth Anniversary, Order of St. George, and Spring Flowers) three from the New Orleans Museum of Art, (Note: Danish Palaces, Caucasus, and Napoleonic) two from the Royal Collection, (Note: Colonnade and Mosaic) one from the Cleveland Museum of Art, (Note: Red Cross with Triptych) and three from private collections. (Note: Pansy, Love Trophies, and Blue Striped Enamel)

=== Location of the "Imperial" eggs ===
Location/owner	Number of eggs	Eggs in collection
Kremlin Armoury, Moscow, Russia	10	Memory of Azov, Bouquet of Lilies Clock, Trans-Siberian Railway, Clover Leaf, Moscow Kremlin, Alexander Palace, Standart Yacht, Alexander III Equestrian, Romanov Tercentenary, Steel Military
Viktor Vekselberg's Link of Times foundation, Fabergé Museum in Saint Petersburg, Russia	9	Hen, Renaissance, Rosebud, Coronation, Lilies of the Valley, Cockerel, Fifteenth Anniversary, Bay Tree, Order of St. George
Virginia Museum of Fine Arts, Richmond, Virginia, U.S.	5	Revolving Miniatures, Pelican, Peter the Great, Czarevich, Red Cross with Imperial Portraits
Royal Collection, London, United Kingdom	3	Basket of Wild Flowers, Colonnade, Mosaic
Matilda Geddings Gray Foundation (displayed at the Metropolitan Museum of Art, New York City, U.S.)	3	Danish Palaces, Caucasus, Napoleonic
Edouard and Maurice Sandoz Foundation, Lausanne, Switzerland	2	Swan, Peacock
Hillwood Estate, Museum & Gardens, Washington, D.C., U.S.	2	Twelve Monograms, Catherine the Great
Walters Art Museum, Baltimore, Maryland, U.S.	2	Gatchina Palace, Rose Trellis
Cleveland Museum of Art, Cleveland, Ohio, U.S.	1	Red Cross with Triptych
Albert II of Monaco collection, Monte Carlo, Monaco	1	Blue Serpent Clock
Alexander Ivanov (displayed at Ivanov's Fabergé Museum in Baden-Baden, Germany)	1	Karelian Birch (the egg was never delivered to the Tsar due to the February Revolution)
The State of Qatar	1	Winter
Dorothy and Artie McFerrin collection	1	Diamond Trellis
Separate private collections	4	Pansy, Love Trophies, Third Imperial Egg, Empire

=== Location of the Kelch eggs ===
Location/owner	Number of eggs	Eggs in collection
Viktor Vekselberg's Link of Times foundation, Fabergé Museum in Saint Petersburg, Russia	2	Kelch Hen, Chanticleer
Royal Collection, London, UK	1	Twelve Panel
Liechtenstein National Museum	1	Apple Blossom
Dorothy and Artie McFerrin collection	1	Rocaille
Separate private collections	2	Pine Cone, Bonbonnière

=== Location of other eggs ===
Location/owner	Number of eggs	Eggs in collection
Viktor Vekselberg's Link of Times foundation, Fabergé Museum in Saint Petersburg, Russia	4	Duchess of Marlborough, Resurrection, Spring Flowers, Scandinavian
Cleveland Museum of Art	1	Lapis Lazuli
Dorothy and Artie McFerrin collection	1	Nobel Ice
Edouard and Maurice Sandoz Foundation, Lausanne, Switzerland	1	Yusupov
Hermitage Museum, Saint Petersburg, Russia	1	Rothschild
Separate private collections	4	Blue Striped Enamel, Clock, Rose Quartz, Twilight

== In popular culture ==
Due to their rarity and value, Fabergé eggs have acquired cult status and been featured in exhibitions, films, TV series, documentaries, cartoons, and publications, and auctions of original eggs often feature in mainstream news.

They have featured in the plots of several films and television series, including Octopussy (1983), Mr. Belvedere ("Strike" episode, 1985), Love Among Thieves (1987), Murder She Wrote ("An Egg to Die For" episode, 1994), The Simpsons ("'Round Springfield" episode, 1995), Midnight in the Garden of Good and Evil (1997), Case Closed: The Last Wizard of the Century (1999), The Order (2001), Relic Hunter ("M.I.A." episode, 2001), Ocean's Twelve (2004), The Simpsons ("The Last of the Red Hat Mamas" episode, 2005), SpongeBob SquarePants ("What Ever Happened to SpongeBob?" episode, 2008), Thick as Thieves (2009), multiple episodes of White Collar (2009–2014), Leverage ("The Zanzibar Marketplace Job" episode, 2010), American Dad! ("A Jones for a Smith" episode, 2010), The Intouchables (2011), Hustle ("Eat Yourself Slender" episode, 2012), Scooby Doo! Mystery Incorporated ("The House of the Nightmare Witch" episode, 2012), An Easter Bunny Puppy (2013), Person of Interest ("Search and Destroy" episode, 2015), Imperial Eight (2015), Peaky Blinders ("Lilies of the Valley" egg, season 3, episode 6, 2016), Hooten & the Lady ("Moscow" episode, 2016), Game Night (2018), Between Two Ferns: The Movie (2019), Eurovision Song Contest: The Story of Fire Saga (2020), Lupin (2021), Bhamakalapam (2022), and The Murder of Sonic the Hedgehog (2023).

In Danielle Steele's 1987 novel Zoya, a Fabergé egg is a keepsake of the last two remaining members of a noble family. The 2011 digital card game Cabals: Magic & Battle Cards features a Fabergé egg as a collectible card. In 2017, visual artist Jonathan Monaghan exhibited a series of digital prints reinterpreting Fabergé eggs in humorous and surreal ways at the Walters Art Museum in Baltimore.

== See also ==
- Argyle Library Egg
- Egg decorating
- Guilloché
- Tatiana Fabergé
