= Scandinavian (Fabergé egg) =

Fabergé Egg

Scandinavian Fabergé egg
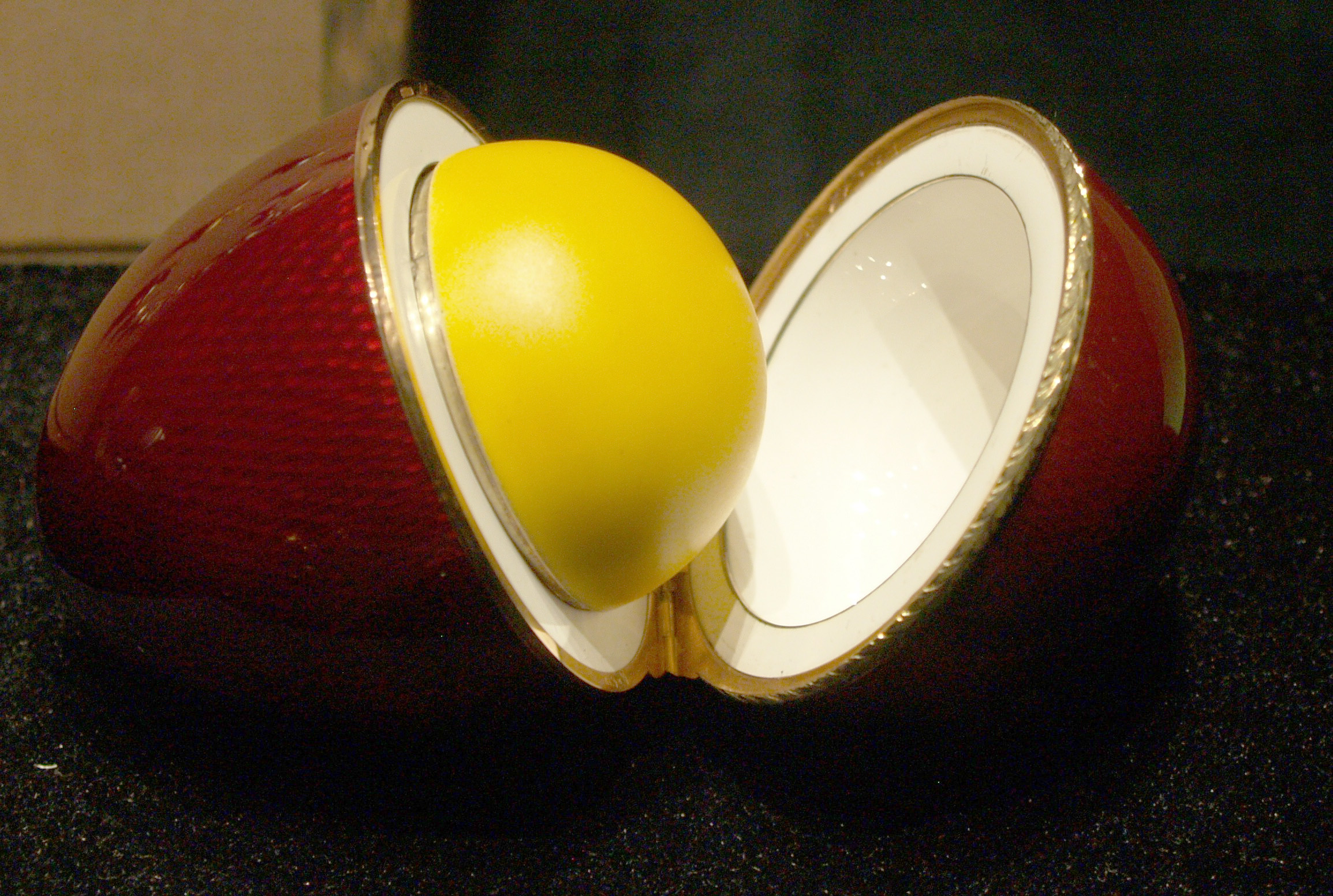
- Year delivered: 1899–1903
- Customer: Unknown St. Petersburg client

Current owner
- Individual or institution: Viktor Vekselberg; Fabergé Museum in Saint Petersburg, Russia
- Year of acquisition: 2004

Design and materials
- Workmaster: Michael Perkhin
- Materials used: Gold, translucent strawberry red enamel, diamonds
- Height: 74 millimetres (2.9 in)
- Surprise: The egg opens to reveal an enamelled yolk, which contains a miniature hen.

The Scandinavian egg, also known as the Quisling egg, is an enamelled Easter egg made by Michael Perchin under the supervision of the Russian jeweller Peter Carl Fabergé between 1899 and 1903. The egg was made for a St. Petersburg client, one of the very few Fabergé eggs that were not made for the Russian Imperial Family.

== Design ==
The egg opens to reveal an enamelled yolk, which contains a miniature hen.

== History ==
Rediscovered in an Oslo bank safe, among the possessions of Maria Quisling, the widow of World War II fascist collaborator Vidkun Quisling, it was acquired by Malcolm Forbes for his Fabergé collection in the 1980s.

The Forbes Collection was sold in 2004 to Viktor Vekselberg for almost $100 million.

== See also ==
- Egg decorating
