= Rose Trellis (Fabergé egg) =

1907 Imperial Fabergé egg

Rose Trellis Fabergé egg
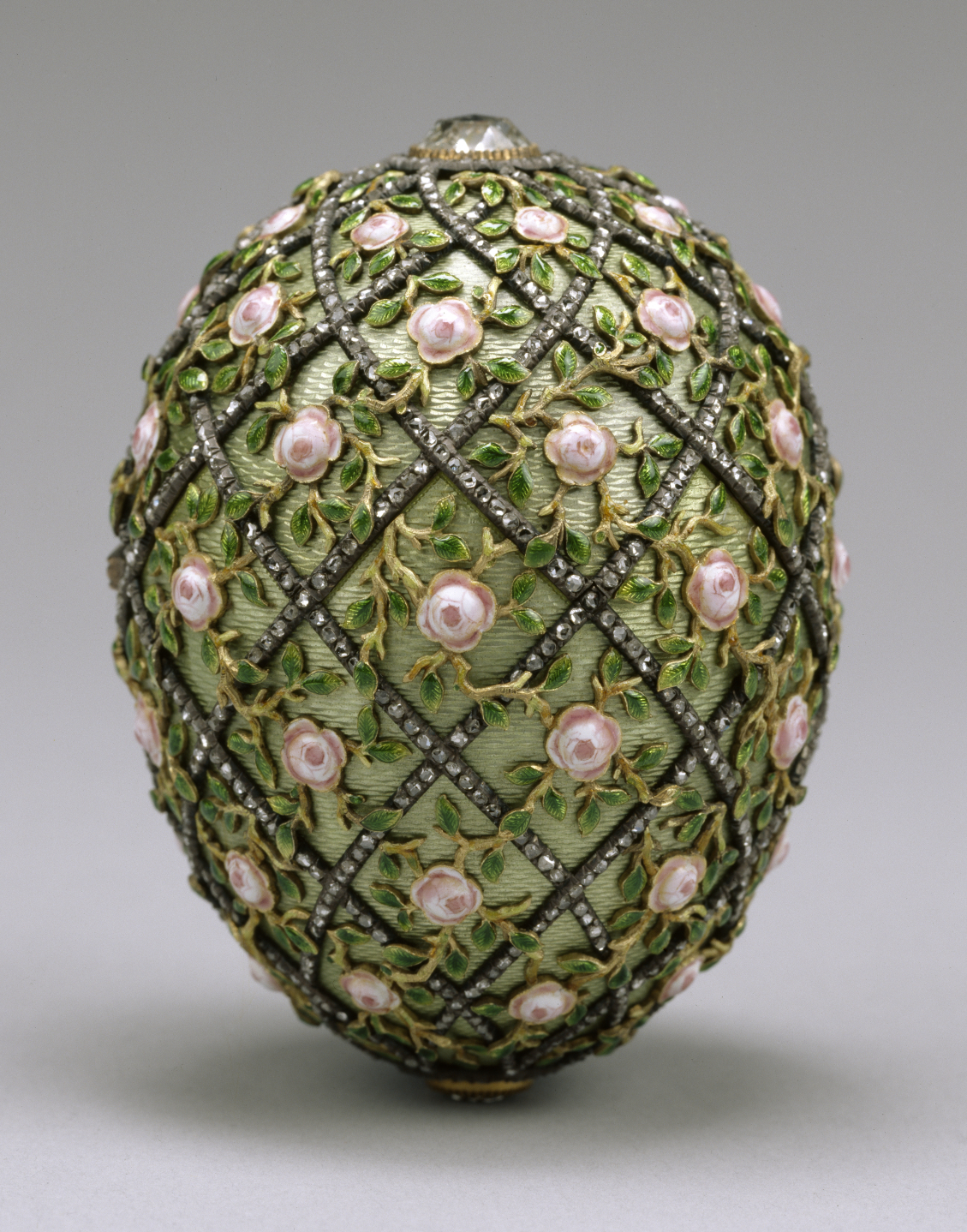
- The Rose Trellis Egg
- Year delivered: 1907
- Customer: Nicholas II
- Recipient: Alexandra Feodorovna

Current owner
- Individual or institution: Walters Art Museum
- Year of acquisition: 1931

Design and materials
- Workmaster: Henrik Wigström
- Height: 77 millimetres (3.0 in)
- Surprise: Diamond necklace and an ivory miniature portrait of the tsarevich (missing)

The Rose Trellis egg is a jewelled enameled Imperial Fabergé egg made in Saint Petersburg, Russia under the supervision of the jeweler Peter Carl Fabergé in 1907, for Tsar Nicholas II of Russia. It was presented by Tsar Nicholas II to his wife, the Empress Alexandra Feodorovna, on Easter (April 22) 1907. It is now in the Walters Art Museum in Baltimore, Maryland.

== Design ==
The egg was created by Faberge's workmaster, Henrik Wigström, and is crafted of gold, green and pink enamel in various shades, portrait diamonds, rose-cut diamonds and satin lining. The egg is enamelled in translucent pale green and latticed with rose-cut diamonds. It is decorated with enamel roses of opaque light and dark pink colour and emerald green leaves. A portrait diamond is set at either end of this egg, the one at the base covering the date "1907". The monogram was lost. The egg is approximately 7.7 cm in height.

The egg opened to reveal a diamond necklace and an ivory miniature portrait of the tsarevich framed in diamonds which was lost, leaving an impression on the satin lining.

== Ownership ==
Tsar Nicholas II purchased the egg as a gift to his wife, Tsarina Alexandra Fyodorovna. The April 21, 1907 invoice indicated the egg cost 8,300 rubles. In 1920, the egg was in the possession of Alexandre Polovtsov, who was a former employee at Gatchina Palace and later started an antique shop in Paris. It is unknown how Polovtsov acquired the egg. In 1930, the egg was sold along with the 1901 Gatchina Palace egg to Henry Walters and became a part of the Walters Art Museum Collection in 1931. In 1936, the egg was exhibited along with the Gatchina Palace egg at the Walters Art Museum, Baltimore, Maryland and has been on permanent exhibition since 1952.

== See also ==
- Objet d'art

== Sources ==
- Faber, Toby (2008). Faberge's Eggs: The Extraordinary Story of the Masterpieces That Outlived an Empire. Random House. ISBN 978-1-4000-6550-9.
- Forbes, Christopher; Prinz von Hohenzollern, Johann Georg (1990). FABERGE; The Imperial Eggs. Prestel. ASIN B000YA9GOM.
- Lowes, Will (2001). Fabergé Eggs: A Retrospective Encyclopedia. Scarecrow Press. ISBN 0-8108-3946-6.
- Snowman, A Kenneth (1988). Carl Faberge: Goldsmith to the Imperial Court of Russia. Gramercy. ISBN 0-517-40502-4.
