= Catherine the Great (Fabergé egg) =

1914 Imperial Fabergé egg

Coordinates: 38.9437°N 77.0526°W

Catherine the Great Fabergé egg
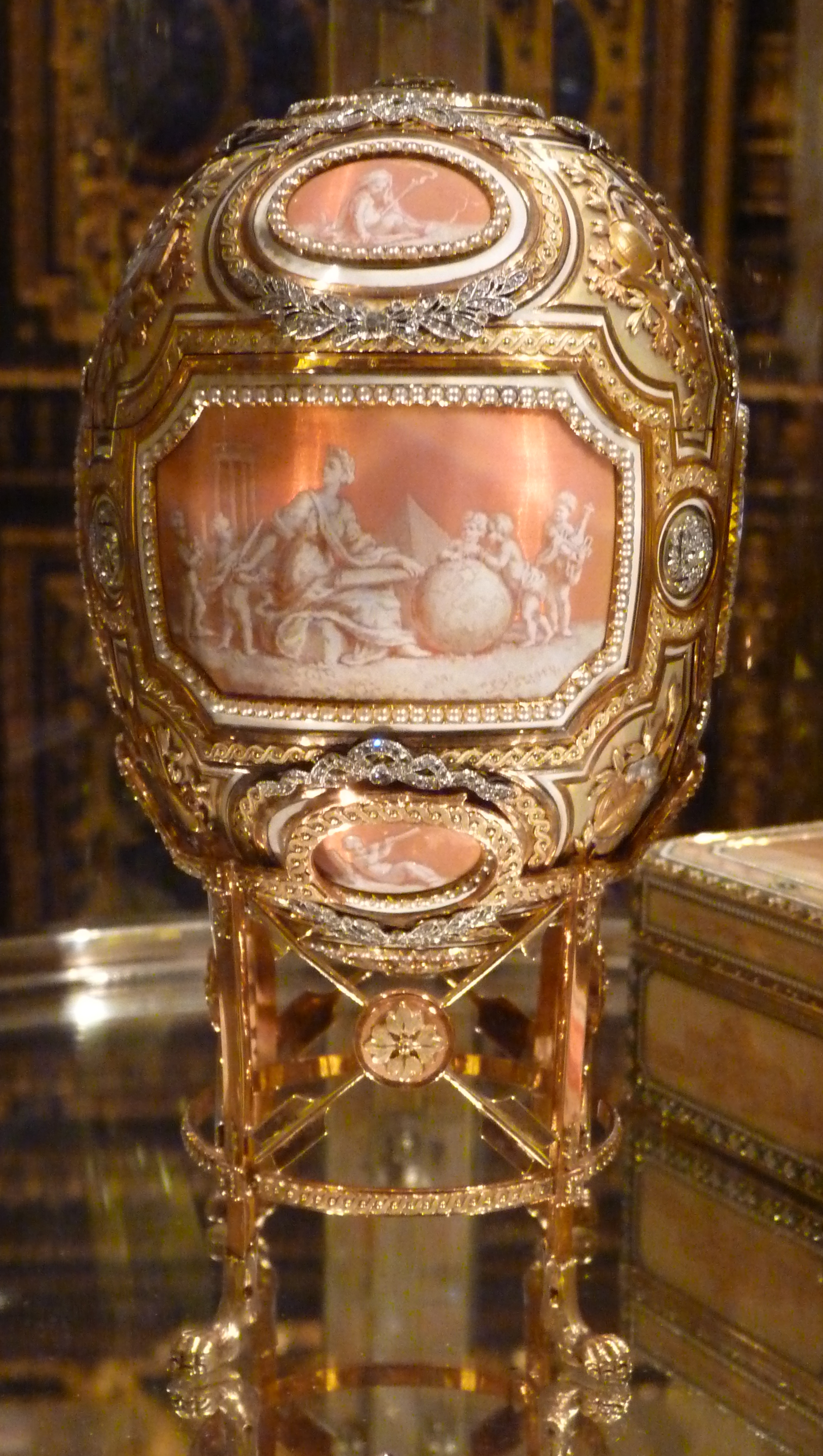
- The egg with a later matching stand made in 1940
- Year delivered: 1914
- Customer: Nicholas II
- Recipient: Maria Feodorovna

Current owner
- Individual or institution: Hillwood Museum
- Year of acquisition: 1973

Design and materials
- Workmaster: Henrik Wigström
- Materials used: Gold, enamel, diamond
- Height: 121 millimetres (4.8 in)
- Surprise: Catherine the Great in sedan chair (missing)

The Catherine the Great egg, also known as Grisaille Egg and Pink Cameo Egg, is an Imperial Fabergé egg, one of a series of fifty-four jewelled enameled Easter eggs made under the supervision of Peter Carl Fabergé for the Russian Imperial family.

== History ==
It was an Easter 1914 gift for Tsarina Maria Feodorovna from her son Tsar Nicholas II, who had a standing order of two Easter eggs every year, one for his mother and one for his wife.

The egg was made by Henrik Wigström, "Fabergé's last head workmaster". The egg in gold and diamonds on a claw-foot stand features pink enamel panels painted in cameo style with miniature allegorical scenes of the arts and sciences based on French artist François Boucher.

The Dowager Empress described the egg in a letter to her sister, Queen Alexandra of the United Kingdom:

He [Nicholas II] wrote me a most charming letter and presented me with a most beautiful Easter egg. Fabergé brought it to me himself. It is a true chef d'oeuvre in pink enamel and inside a porte-chaise carried by two negroes with Empress Catherine in it wearing a little crown on her head. You wind it up and then the negroes walk: it is an unbelievable beautiful and superbly fine piece of work. Fabergé is the greatest genius of our time, I also told him: Vous êtes un génie incomparable.

The egg's surprise, also described as "a mechanical sedan chair, carried by two blackamoors, with Catherine the Great seated inside" has since been lost.

It forms part of the Marjorie Merriweather Post collection at Hillwood Museum in Washington, D.C.

Its Easter 1914 counterpart (presented to the Empress Alexandra Feodorovna) is the Mosaic Egg, now in the Royal Collection in London.

The stand in four colour gold has four legs ending in lion's feet and crossed arrows joining legs to each other. Commissioned by Post and made in 1940, it was modelled after that of the 1898 Pelican egg, but replicating some of the decorative elements seen in the Catherine the Great egg, like the typically Louis XVI style interlacing pattern.
