= Nobel's Ice Egg (Fabergé egg) =

1914 Fabergé egg

Nobel's Ice Egg Fabergé egg
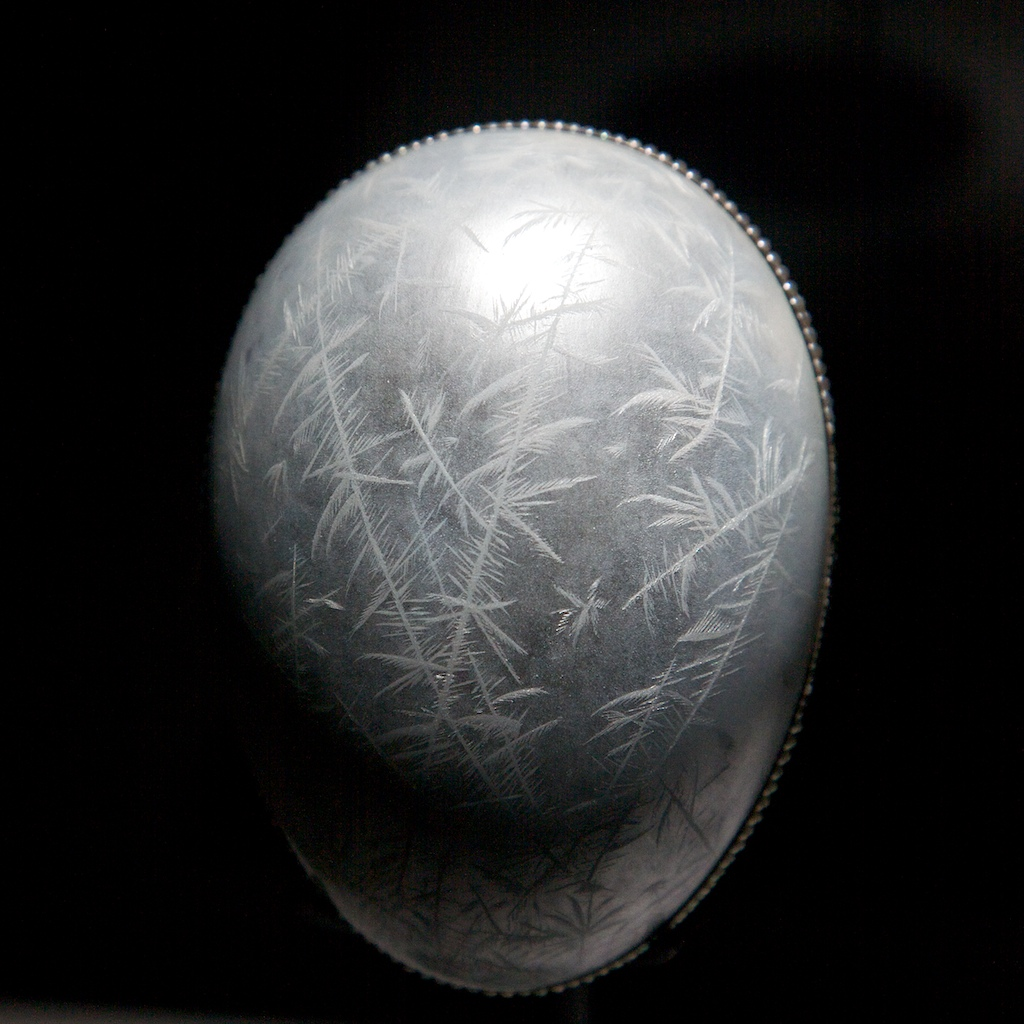
- Year delivered: 1914
- Customer: Emanuel Nobel
- Recipient: Unknown

Current owner
- Individual or institution: Artie and Dorothy McFerrin

Design and materials
- Materials used: platinum
- Height: 70 millimetres (2.8 in)
- Surprise: watch

The Nobel's Ice Egg (Russian: Ледяное яйцо Нобеля), sometimes also referred to as the Snowflake egg, is a jeweled Fabergé egg made under the supervision of the Russian jeweler Peter Carl Fabergé for the Swedish-Russian oil baron and industrialist Emanuel Nobel between 1913 and 1914.

Unlike many of the eggs made in Fabergé's workshop, this egg is not considered an "imperial" egg as it was not given by a Russian Emperor to any Empress.

== Design ==
The pearl-colored ground of the shell is covered with white enamel in alternating transparent and opaque layers each painted and engraved separately to resemble frost, the result is the icy opalescence of a winter morning. The egg, without support, lies on its side and opens in half along the greater perimeter, on the edges there is a row of beads. It lacks the realism of the Winter Egg which, however, shares the inspiration and technique in the execution of the hinges inside the jagged edges. It was designed by Alma Theresia Pihl as was the Winter Egg.

=== Surprise ===
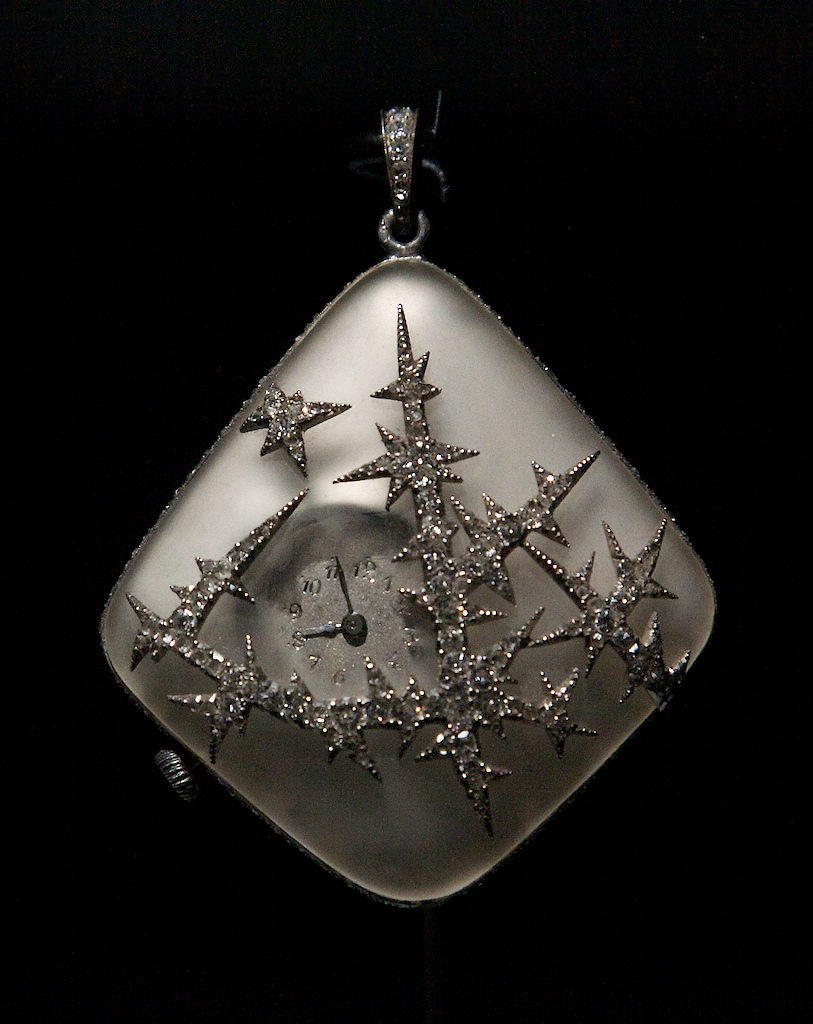
Surprise in the Nobel Ice egg

Inside there is a watch pendant, the dial is partly hidden by decorations in the shape of ice crystals placed on the case, made of opalescent rock crystal.

== History ==
After the Russian Revolution, it was sold to the Parisian dealer A. A. Anatra, who subsequently sold it to Jacques Zolotnitzky, of A La Vieille Russie, in Paris. It was later sold to a North-American collector.

In 1994, it was sold at Christie's, in Geneva, for $220,000.

The Nobel Ice egg's current owner are Artie and Dorothy McFerrin of Houston. It is on loan at the Houston Museum of Natural Science.
