= Nécessaire (Fabergé egg) =

1889 Imperial Fabergé egg

Nécessaire Fabergé egg
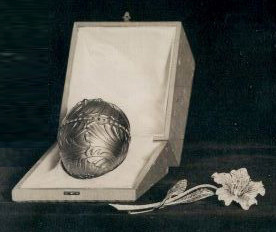
- Year delivered: 1889
- Customer: Alexander III
- Recipient: Maria Feodorovna

Current owner
- Individual or institution: Unknown
- Year of acquisition: Last known 1952

Design and materials
- Workmaster: Unknown
- Materials used: Gold, sapphires, emeralds, rubies, diamonds, pearl ring
- Height: Unknown
- Width: Unknown
- Surprise: 13 diamond-encrusted gold woman's toilet implements

The Nécessaire egg is an Imperial Fabergé egg, one of a series of fifty-two jewelled eggs made under the supervision of Peter Carl Fabergé for the Russian Imperial family. It was crafted and delivered to the then Tsar of Russia, Alexander III who presented it to his wife, Maria Feodorovna on Easter day 1889. The egg is one of the lost Imperial eggs, but is known to have survived the Russian Revolution and was sold by Wartski in London in 1952.

== Design of egg ==
This egg was designed as an étui containing woman's toilet items. The exact appearance of the egg was unknown for decades, until it was identified in two different photographs in the early 21st century.

The piece was first identified in a 1949 Wartski firm's archival photo, when it was on exhibition in the antique dealer's shop in London. The discovery was announced in the weekly magazine Country Life on 20 March 2008. In that 1949 photograph, the egg is partially seen in a vitrine, although its image is not very clear. However, in 2017 a more detailed photo was found by a Fabergé amateur researcher after scrolling through images on the internet. The news was published in the Daily Mail on 29 December 2017. The old shot shows a group of Russian treasures, including on the left the missing 1889 Easter egg in a box.

Until then, the information available was brief descriptions, as the one found in the 1917 inventory of confiscated imperial treasure, where it was listed as being decorated with "multi-coloured stones and brilliants, rubies, emeralds and sapphires."

=== Surprise in egg ===
The surprise was that the egg was essentially an etui, or ladies' necessaire, with 13 diamond-encrusted implements.

== History ==
On 9 April 1889, Alexander III presented the egg to his wife, Maria Feodorovna. It was housed at the Gatchina Palace and was taken on at least one trip to Moscow, as demonstrated by an invoice for the trip which describes the egg.

After the 1917 revolution the Nécessaire Egg was seized along with the rest of the imperial eggs and sent to the Armoury Palace of the Kremlin. During the early part of 1922 the egg was transferred to the Sovnarkom. It was last shown at Wartski Ltd., court jewellers and Fabergé specialists. It was shown at Wartski's in 1949 as part of the first dedicated exhibition of Faberge's works in Europe. It was later acquired and sold by the firm. In an article on the egg, Wartski states, "It was last recorded [on our premises] on the 19th June 1952 when it was sold to a buyer named as 'A Stranger' for £1250 (equivalent to £31,000 in 2025) ... The purchaser's anonymity was safeguarded throughout Wartski's records and they remain unidentified." Its current whereabouts are unknown.

== See also ==
- Egg decorating
- List of missing treasure

== Sources ==
- Faber, Toby (2008). Faberge's Eggs: The Extraordinary Story of the Masterpieces That Outlived an Empire. Random House. ISBN 978-1-4000-6550-9.
- Forbes, Christopher; Prinz von Hohenzollern, Johann Georg (1990). FABERGE; The Imperial Eggs. Prestel. ASIN B000YA9GOM.
- Lowes, Will (2001). Fabergé Eggs: A Retrospective Encyclopedia. Scarecrow Press. ISBN 0-8108-3946-6.
- Snowman, A Kenneth (1988). Carl Faberge: Goldsmith to the Imperial Court of Russia. Gramercy. ISBN 0-517-40502-4.
