= Kelch Hen (Fabergé egg) =

1898 Fabergé Kelch Egg

Kelch Hen Fabergé egg
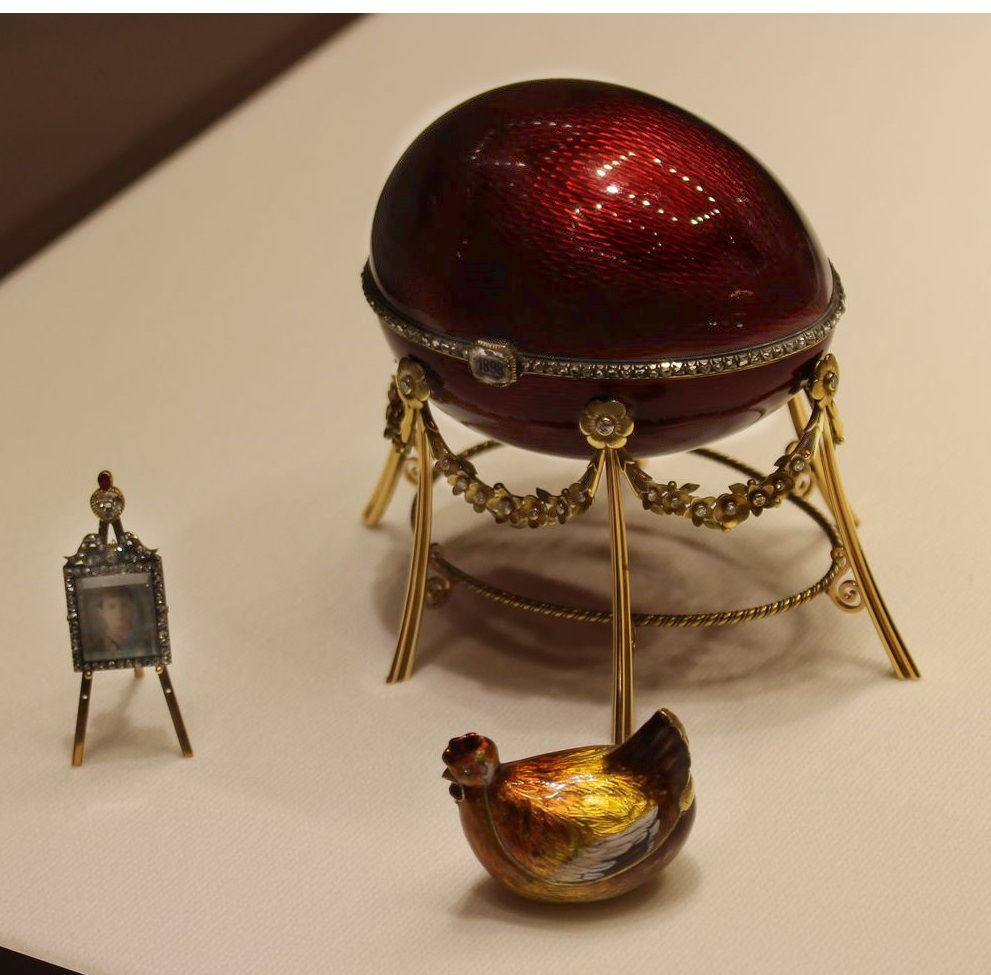
- Year delivered: 1898
- Customer: Alexander Ferdinandovich Kelch
- Recipient: Barbara Kelch-Bazanova

Current owner
- Individual or institution: Viktor Vekselberg; Fabergé Museum in Saint Petersburg, Russia
- Year of acquisition: 2004

Design and materials
- Workmaster: Michael Perkhin

The Kelch Hen egg is a jewelled, enameled Easter egg that was made in St. Petersburg between 1898 and 1903 under the supervision of Michael Perkhin, on behalf of the Russian jeweler Peter Carl Fabergé. It was made for the Russian industrialist Alexander Ferdinandovich Kelch, who presented the egg to his wife, Barbara Kelch-Bazanova. It is thought to be the first of the seven eggs that, every year from 1898 to 1904, were ordered by Alexander Kelch and made by Michael Perkhin, Fabergé master goldsmith at the time, frequently inspired by the imperial eggs.

The egg opens in half lengthwise, and is made from gold, translucent red enamel, opaque white enamel, and matte yellow enamel. It features rose-cut and portrait diamonds, with a suede lining. A monogram of the year 1898 and a miniature portrait of Tsar Nicholas II appear under the two largest diamonds. The yellow yolk "surprise" opens to reveal a miniature hen, crafted from gold and white and brown enamel. An additional miniature easel "surprise" from inside the hen is composed from gold, rose-cut diamonds, cabochon ruby, and watercolor paint, possibly atop ivory. The easel's frame now contains a miniature portrait of Alexei Nikolaevich wearing the uniform of the Rifle Regiment (4th Brigade) of the Russian Imperial Guard. This portrait purportedly replaced one of Barbara Kelch-Bazanova in the 1930s, while the portrait of his father may have replaced one of Alexander Kelch.

After the October Revolution of 1917, the egg was offered for sale with five other Kelch Fabergé eggs by a Paris jeweler in 1920. It has passed through several private collections, including that of Forbes Magazine, but is now held by the Fabergé Museum in Saint Petersburg. The detachable six-footed gold stand the egg is displayed on is not original to the object. The stand, made from varicolored gold and decorated with diamond-set floral swags, was ordered by King Farouk of Egypt some time in the mid-20th century when he was the owner of the egg.

== Sources ==
- Faber, Toby (2008). Faberge's Eggs: The Extraordinary Story of the Masterpieces That Outlived an Empire. Random House. ISBN 978-1-4000-6550-9.
- Forbes, Christopher; Prinz von Hohenzollern, Johann Georg (1990). FABERGE; The Imperial Eggs. Prestel. ASIN B000YA9GOM.
- Lowes, Will (2001). Fabergé Eggs: A Retrospective Encyclopedia. Scarecrow Press. ISBN 0-8108-3946-6.
- Snowman, A Kenneth (1988). Carl Faberge: Goldsmith to the Imperial Court of Russia. Gramercy. ISBN 0-517-40502-4.
