= Empire Nephrite (Fabergé egg) =

1902 Imperial Fabergé egg

Empire Nephrite Fabergé egg
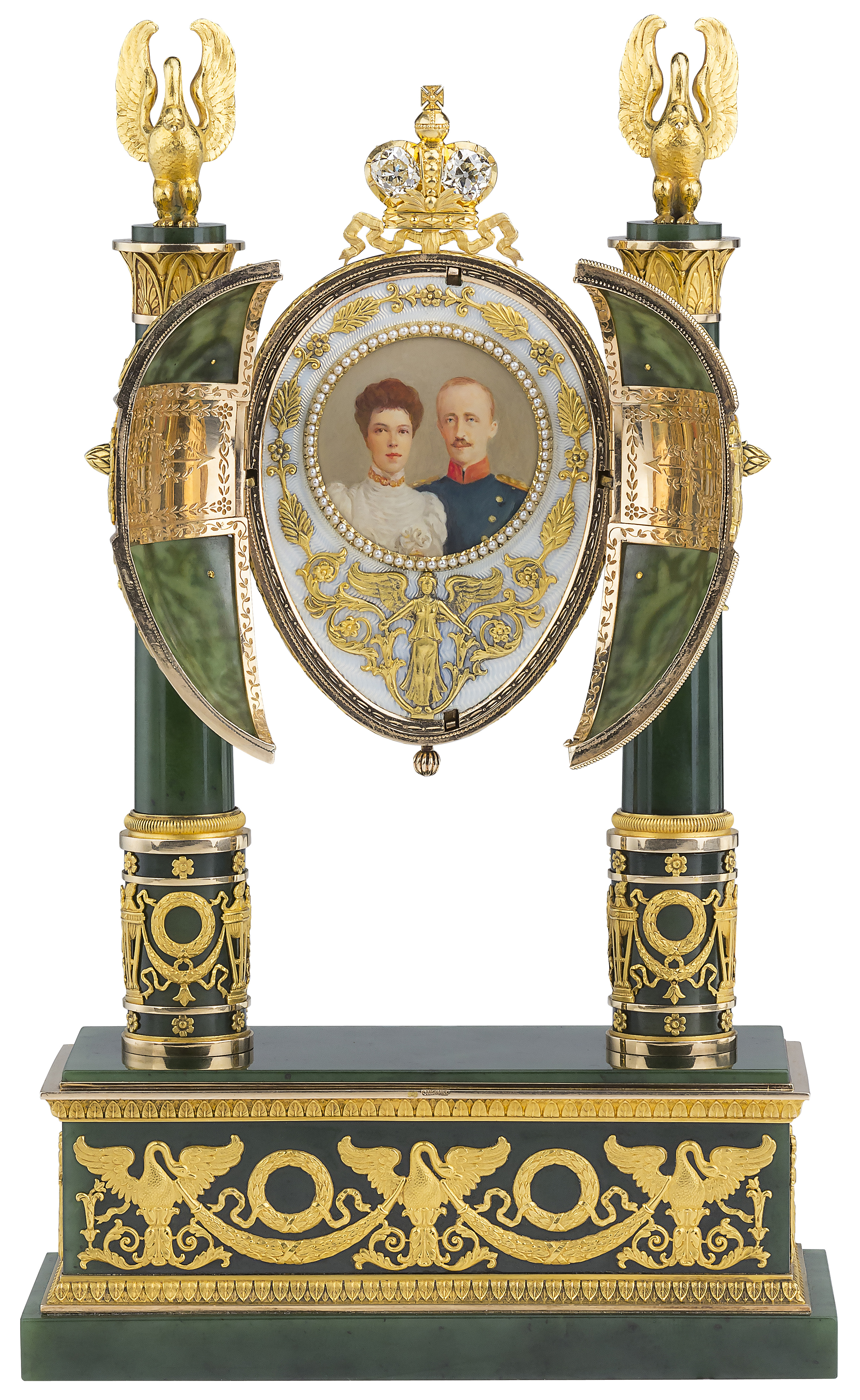
- Year delivered: 1902
- Customer: Nicholas II
- Recipient: Maria Feodorovna

Current owner
- Individual or institution: Richard Wenner, New York, United States
- Year of acquisition: Last known mid-1990s

Design and materials
- Workmaster: Michael Perkhin
- Materials used: Gold, silver, steel, enamel, nephrite, pearls, two brilliants (replacements)
- Height: The egg 95 millimetres (3.7 in).; overall 215 millimetres (8.5 in)
- Width: The egg 63 millimetres (2.5 in) diameter
- Surprise: Miniature portrait of Grand Duchess Olga Alexandrovna of Russia and Duke Peter Alexandrovich of Oldenburg (original lost)

The Empire Nephrite egg is a jewelled Easter egg, purported to be one of the Imperial Eggs made under the supervision of the Russian jeweller Peter Carl Fabergé in 1901–1902 for Nicholas II of Russia, who presented it to his mother, the Dowager Empress Maria Feodorovna, on Easter 1902. The provenance has been discussed with varying perspectives among Fabergé researchers.

== History ==
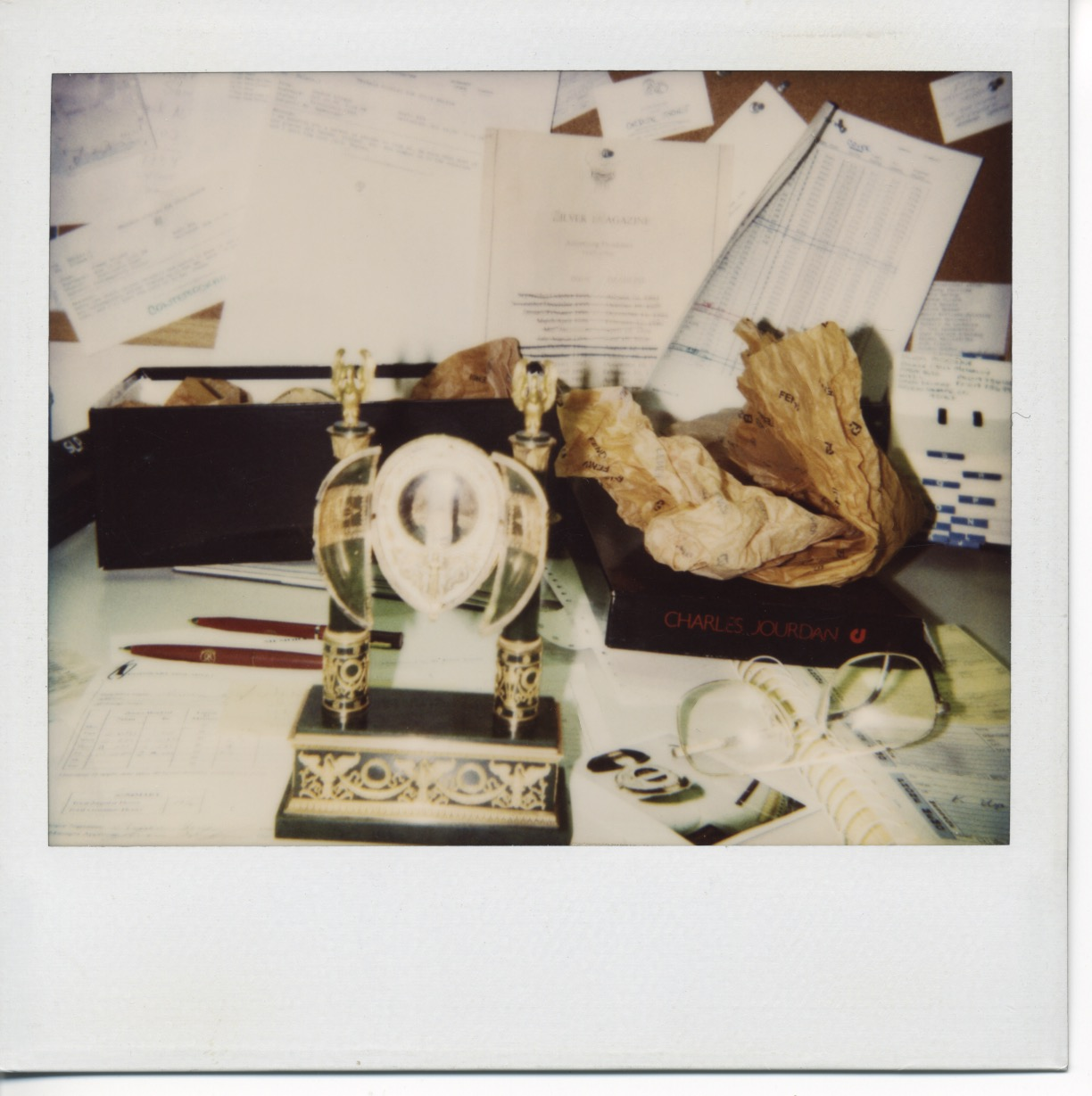
One of the first images of Empire Fabergé egg in the mid-1990s. The loss of crown and miniature are visible.

The name of the egg refers to the fact that it was made in the Empire Style, from nephrite. The original Fabergé invoice reads: "Egg, 'Empire', from nephrite, with gold, two diamonds and miniature".

In 2015, during research by a specially commissioned group of experts, a unique historical document was brought to the attention of the experts – the "List of the personal property of the Dowager Empress Maria Feodorovna, located in storage at Gatchina Palace" as of 28 July 1917. This 12-page booklet mentions at least 150 items, including 7 Imperial Fabergé eggs that belonged to the Dowager Empress Maria Feodorovna. This document was first published in 2013.

On the second page of this document, as number 10, there is a description "Egg with gold mounts, on two nephrite columns, with portraits of Gr. Dss. Olga Alexandrovna and Duke P.A. Oldenburg inside". This description is the most accurate that Fabergé researchers have to date concerning the egg of 1902, which was previously mistaken for an "Egg from nephrite, on a gold base and with portrait of the Emperor Alexander III in a medallion".

The egg is currently in a private collection in New York, USA.

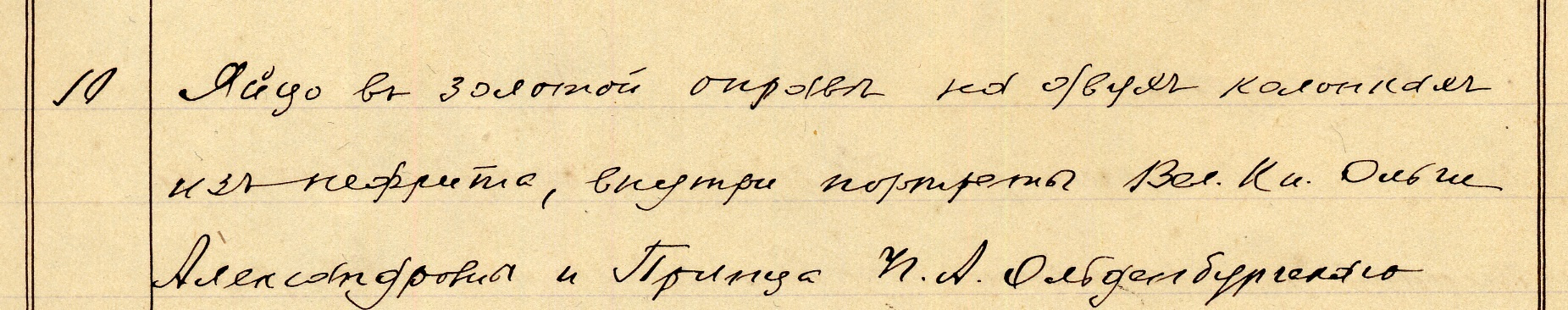
Description in Russian of the Empire Fabergé egg in the list of items of the Gatchina Palace from 28 July 1917.

== Provenance of the egg ==
1902 – 1918

The egg is believed to have been commissioned as a gift for the Dowager Empress Maria Feodorovna. The Faberge bill is, as many are, relatively vague in its description of the work. By 28 July 1917, an inventory had been compiled which describes the egg accurately, including descriptions of the miniature and columns which are the chief identifying features, as well as noting that the egg was present with the other eggs in the collection of the Dowager Empress at Gatchina at the time she left for Kiev in 1914. These works remained in place at Gatchina until the inventory was compiled in July 1917.

1918 – 1996

The work appears to have remained in the Soviet Union with the Schwarz family. After the fall of communism, when both personal property and the sale of antiques became legal again in 1990’s, the heirs of Schwarz approached the St. Petersburg antique dealer Evgeniy Malyshev, who bought the work from the family. Before Malyshev's death in 2004, the work was acquired by a private group who exported the work to London where it was first seen in 1996 at Christie’s in poor condition, and missing several elements. Some Fabergé researchers were of the mistaken opinion that this egg featured a portrait medallion of Alexander III of Russia, though the original bill did not refer to a portrait of Alexander III.

1996 – 2004

The egg was acquired by a private group who quickly performed restorations and additions to the work, documented in a 2004 private publication written by Faberge Scholars under the editorship of Alexander von Solodkoff reintroduced the egg to the public with a full-throated endorsement of the egg's authenticity.

2004 – 2012

The egg was variously offered for sale by several agents and owners until it was acquired in 2012 by its current American owner.

2012 – 2015

The egg was inspected in New York on 27 January 2015, the meeting was attended by the egg's owner, Fabergé specialist Geza von Habsburg, restorer Nikolai Bashmakov, Wartski Director Kieran McCarthy, Sotheby's Karen Kettering, the ex-Forbes Collection's Carol Aiken, keeper of the Fabergé collection in Armory Chamber (Moscow Kremlin) Tatiana Muntyan, and famous Fabergé researcher Valentin Skurlov. A second meeting took place also in New York on 18 May 2015. This time, Kieran McCarthy, Geza von Habsburg, Carol Aiken opted out.

2015 – present

In 2017, “Faberge: The Imperial Egg of 1902” was published by Harrison Piper & Co., with an introduction and series of scholarly articles by conservator Nikolai Bachmakov, Faberge descendant, jeweler and historian Tatiana Faberge, scholar Dmitry Krivoshey, Fabergé specialist Nicholas B.A. Nicholson, independent researchers Anna and Vincent Palmade, and scholar Valentin Skurlov, all of whom agreed on the authenticity of the egg. Supplemental expertise in metallurgy was provided by Dr. Lev Deresh, and in a supplemental appendix, expertises were provided by the Igor Carl Faberge Foundation, Valentin Skurlov, Roizin Refining, Boris Igdalov and AGTA gemological testing. Further, Sotheby’s private sale documentation is included, identifying the egg as the one featured in the Gatchina list.

== Authenticity ==
Many Faberge experts and scholars have publicly supported the authenticity of Empire Egg through various publications and presentations at international scholars’ conferences (Fabergé International Conference in Saint-Petersburg, 2016). However, the egg's authenticity is disputed by some Fabergé experts, who believe the Empire Nephrite egg is lost or still missing. This is contested with the argument that many disputing experts haven't seen the Empire Egg recently and haven't reviewed the newly discovered Gatchina Palace Inventory Book, which reportedly shows the Empire Egg at Gatchina in 1917. This suggests their skepticism might be based on outdated information.

In particular, public assertions have been made about the authenticity of the egg by Andre Ruzhnikov, a London-based Russian art dealer with a specialty in Faberge.

In 2017, the book "Fabergé: The Imperial “Empire” Egg of 1902" was published with its authors presenting arguments in support of the egg’s authenticity.

== See also ==
- Egg decorating
- Fabergé egg
- List of missing treasure
