= Spring Flowers (Fabergé egg) =

Fabergé egg

Spring Flowers Fabergé egg
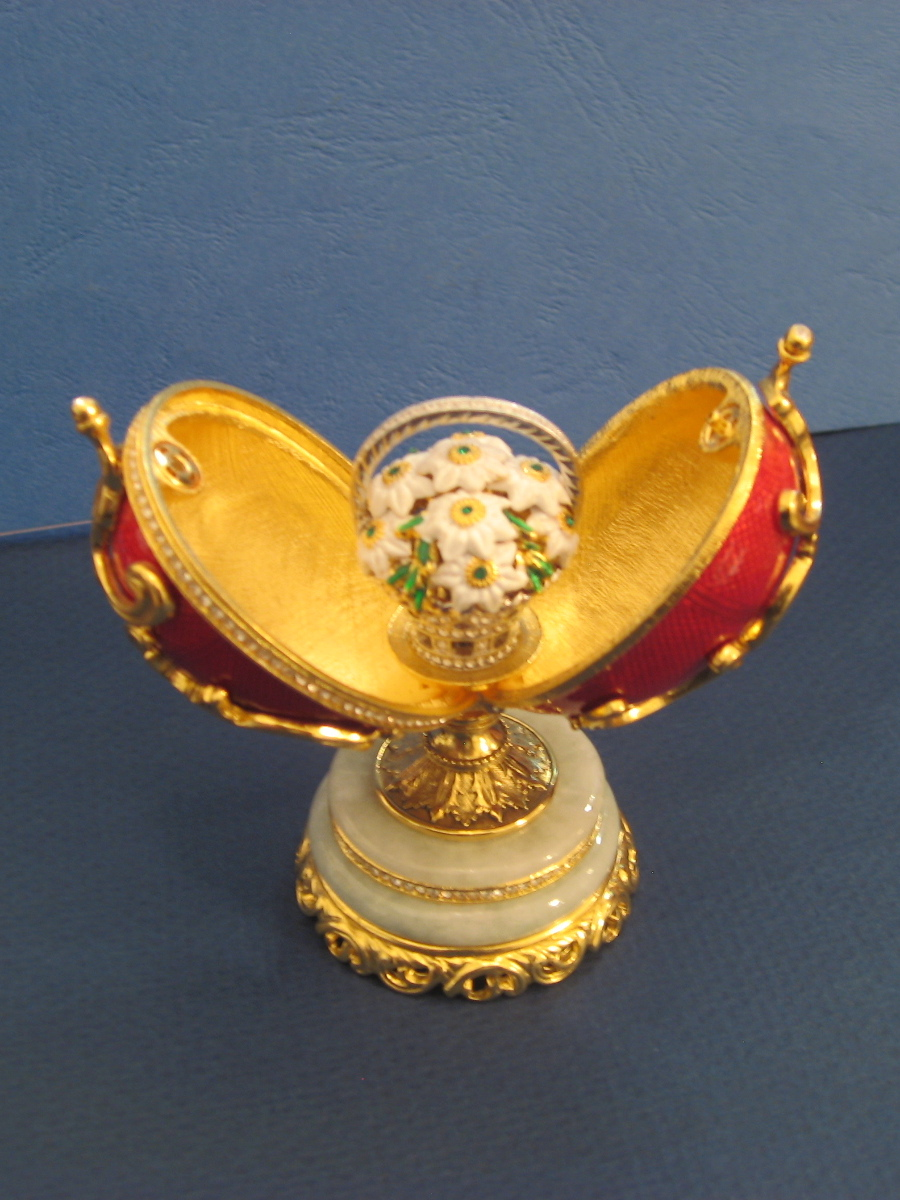
- Modern replica
- Year delivered: 1890
- Customer: Uncertain

Current owner
- Individual or institution: Viktor Vekselberg; Fabergé Museum in Saint Petersburg, Russia
- Year of acquisition: 2004

Design and materials
- Workmaster: Michael Perkhin
- Materials used: Gold enameled in red glass with diamonds
- Height: 83 millimetres (3.3 in)
- Surprise: Platinum basket of garnet and chalcedony flowers

The Spring Flowers egg, sometimes referred to as the Imperial Spring Flowers egg, was considered one of the Imperial Easter eggs attributed to Peter Carl Fabergé (and therefore one of the Fabergé eggs). If it is an authentic Imperial egg, then the Spring Flowers egg would have been the first in the series of "flower eggs" and would have been created between 1885 and 1890. It consists of a case made of white maple covered in leather with steel hinges and clasps containing a smaller egg (the official "Fabergé" egg) decorated in red enamel and gold scroll work placed upright on a small stand of carved bowenite which then opens vertically to reveal a fully removable bower of flowers made of garnets and white chalcedony in a basket of platinum. The red egg stands 3.25 inches (83 mm) high, and the bower inside it 1.5 inches (38 mm). It was purchased by Russian businessman Viktor Vekselberg in 2004 as part of a collection of such eggs and various other Fabergé items.

The authenticity of this egg has been cast in doubt by Fabergé experts. Its method of construction is noticeably sub par, having diamonds of mismatched size and with inferior quality attachments, and two halves that are asymmetrical, failings not characteristic of Fabergé's workshop. It also does not bear the expected maker's marks, and has other design features which may signal its status as a counterfeit piece. Although it has been examined many times by experts who have often agreed with its original attribution, there is no record of who might have supposedly given it to the Romanovs and no correspondence between Faberge and either of the last two Russian emperors to confirm its commissioning or its delivery. Neither does it have a clearly documented provenience or record of ownership. Although its materials (gold, diamonds, enamel, etc.) are typical of Fabergé's workshop, the method of construction and inadequate/ incomplete history cast significant doubt on its authenticity.

== See also ==
- Objet d'art
- Fauxbergé
