= Rose Quartz (Fabergé egg) =

1899 Fabergé egg

Rose Quartz Fabergé egg
- Year delivered: 1899
- Customer: unknown

Current owner
- Individual or institution: private collection
- Year of acquisition: unknown

Design and materials
- Workmaster: Michael Perkhin
- Materials used: gold, silver, platinum, rubies, diamonds, quartz, onyx
- Height: 305 millimetres (12.0 in)
- Surprise: none (clock egg)

The Rose Quartz egg or Pink Quartz egg is a Fabergé egg made by Michael Perkhin under the supervision of Carl Fabergé. It was ordered by an unknown private customer in St. Petersburg. It is currently in a private collection.

== Design ==
The Pink Quartz egg is made of gold, quartz and onyx and is decorated with silver, platinum, rubies, diamonds. In shape and style it is very similar to the Bouquet of Lilies egg, which was also created by workmaster Michael Perkhin in 1899 but for the family of Nicholas II. However, according to the agreement between the Tsar of Russia and Carl Faberge prohibiting copies of imperial eggs, there are several differences. "Pink quartz egg" is made in the form of a vase of pink quartz, in which there is a bouquet of chalcedony lilies, the stems and leaves of lilies are made of gold, and the nuts are decorated with diamonds. From the top of the Easter egg, 12 golden lines depart from the top, dividing the surface by 12 hours. The clock's arrow is made in the form of a bow with an arrow decorated with diamonds. The egg rests on a black onyx base decorated with gold and diamonds showing "1899".

== Surprise ==
As a working clock the egg contains the clock mechanism rather than a hidden surprise.
