= Alexander III Equestrian (Fabergé egg) =

1910 Imperial Fabergé egg

Alexander III Equestrian Fabergé egg
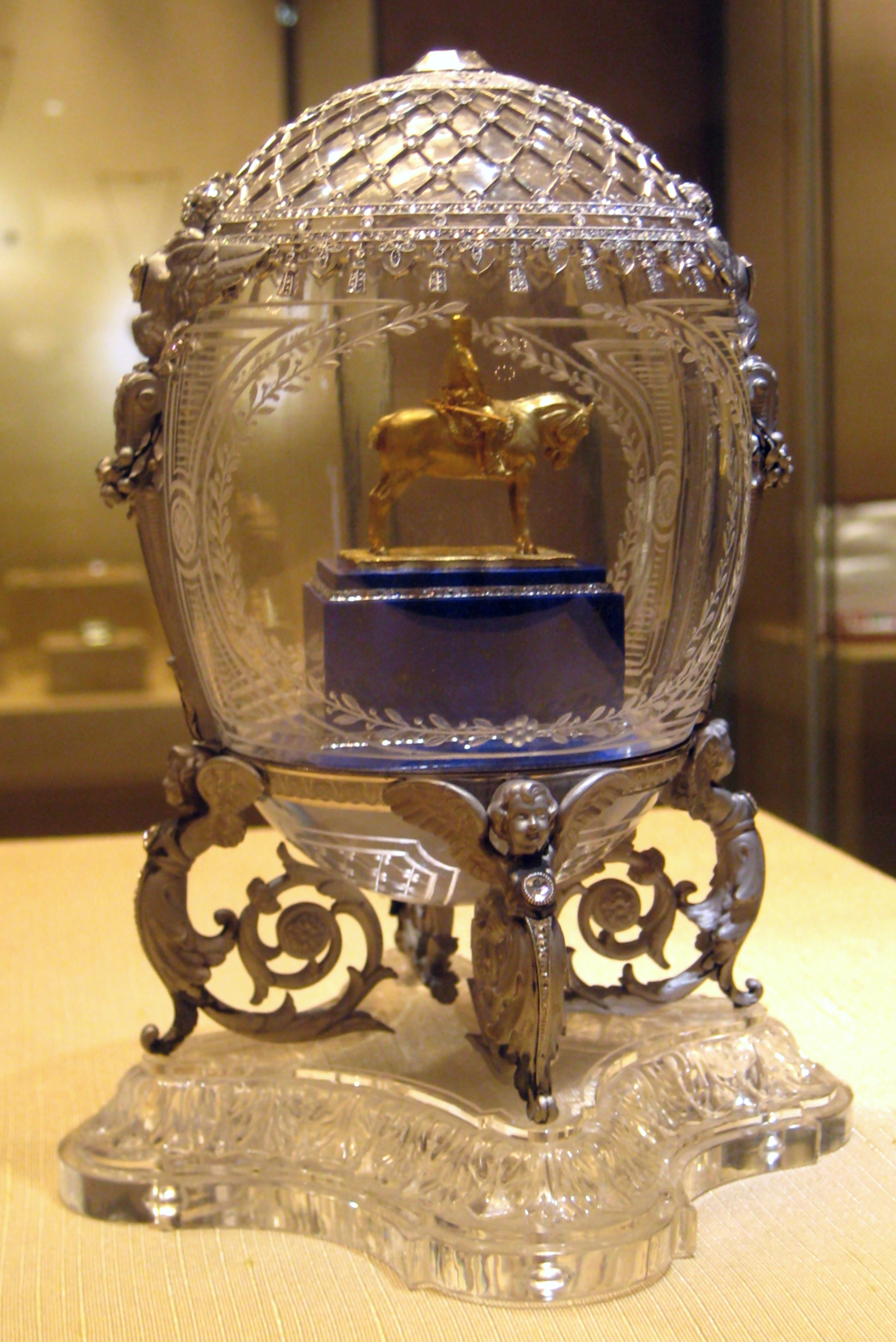
- Alexander III Equestrian Egg
- Year delivered: 1910
- Customer: Nicholas II
- Recipient: Maria Feodorovna

Current owner
- Individual or institution: Kremlin Armoury, Moscow

Design and materials
- Materials used: Quartz, platinum, diamonds, gold, crystal, lapis lazuli
- Height: 155 millimetres (6.1 in)
- Surprise: Miniature golden statue of Alexander III on horseback

The Alexander III Equestrian egg is a jewelled Easter egg made under the supervision of the Russian jeweller Peter Carl Fabergé in 1910, for the last Tsar of Russia, Nicholas II.

Tsar Nicholas presented the Fabergé egg to his mother the Dowager Empress, Maria Fyodorovna, wife of the previous Tsar, Alexander III.

== Craftsmanship ==
The egg itself is carved out of rock-quartz crystal, engraved with two tied laurel leaf sprays, the upper half cloaked with platinum trelliswork and a tasseled fringe, with two consoles shaped as double-headed eagles set with rose-cut diamonds.

A large diamond engraved with the year "1910" surmounts the egg, set in band of small roses, with a rosette border of platinum acanthus leaves. The two platinum double-headed eagles on the sides of the egg have diamond crowns. The surface of the egg between the eagles is engraved with branching patterns, adjoined at the bottom.

The lower part of the egg serves as a platform for a gold model of a statue of Tsar Alexander III on horseback, standing on a lapis lazuli base embellished with two rose-cut diamond bands, engraved with Fabergés signature, supported by cast platinum cherubs coiled into position on a base of crystal.

It is currently held in the Kremlin Armoury Museum in Moscow.

== Sources ==
- Faber, Toby (2008). Faberge's Eggs: The Extraordinary Story of the Masterpieces That Outlived an Empire. Random House. ISBN 978-1-4000-6550-9.
- Forbes, Christopher; Prinz von Hohenzollern, Johann Georg (1990). FABERGE; The Imperial Eggs. Prestel. ASIN B000YA9GOM.
- Lowes, Will (2001). Fabergé Eggs: A Retrospective Encyclopedia. Scarecrow Press. ISBN 0-8108-3946-6.
- Snowman, A Kenneth (1988). Carl Faberge: Goldsmith to the Imperial Court of Russia. Gramercy. ISBN 0-517-40502-4.

== See also ==
- Egg decorating
