= Trans-Siberian Railway (Fabergé egg) =

1900 Imperial Fabergé egg

Trans-Siberian Railway Fabergé egg
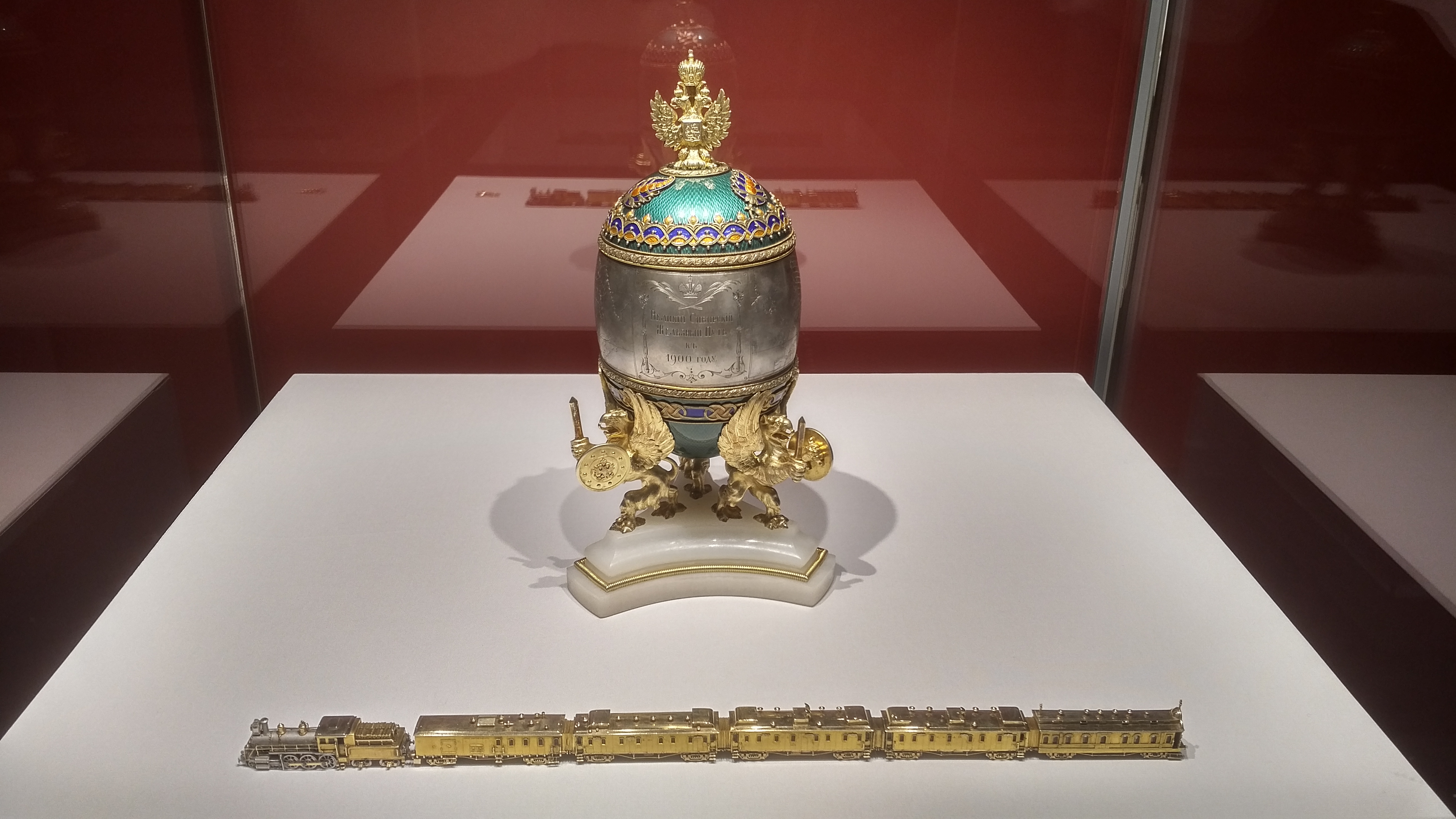
- The Trans-Siberian Railway Egg photographed in the Kremlin in 2020
- Year delivered: 1900
- Customer: Nicholas II
- Recipient: Alexandra Fedorovna

Current owner
- Individual or institution: Kremlin Armoury
- Year of acquisition: 1927

Design and materials
- Workmaster: Michael Perkhin
- Materials used: Gold; silver; green, blue, and orange enamel; onyx; and velvet for lining
- Height: 260 millimetres (10 in)
- Surprise: Miniature train made of gold, platinum, rose-cut diamonds, rubies, and rock crystal

The Trans-Siberian Railway egg is a jewelled Easter egg made under the supervision of the Russian jeweller Peter Carl Fabergé in 1900 for Tsar Nicholas II of Russia. The Fabergé egg was presented by Nicolas II as an Easter gift to his wife, the Tsarina Alexandra Fyodorovna. It is currently held in the Kremlin Armoury Museum in Moscow.

== Design ==
The exterior of the 1900 Trans-Siberian Railway egg is made of onyx, silver, gold, and quartz, and is decorated with colored vitreous enamel. The lid of the egg is hinged, has an overlay of green enamel, and is decorated with inlaid leaves of acanthus. On top of the lid is a golden three-headed eagle in gold with the Imperial Crown. The interior is lined with velvet.

A route map of the Trans-Siberian Railway is engraved in silver across the face, with major stations marked by a precious stone, forming a belt around the egg. The egg is supported by three griffins made of gold-plated silver on a stepped triangular base of white onyx.

== Surprise ==
The surprise is a miniature clockwork replica of a steam train made of gold and platinum in three sections, with an overall length of one foot. It has a diamond headlight, and ruby marker lights. The five carriages have rock crystal windows and are labeled “mail”, “ladies only”, “smoking”, “non-smoking” and “chapel”. The train has a gold key that can be used to wind it up and make it run.

== History ==
In 1900, the railway linking European Russia with Vladivostok on Russia's Pacific coast was nearing completion. This was an accomplishment that, despite its tremendous cost in resources and human lives, brought Nicholas great satisfaction since, as Tsarevitch, he had travelled to the Far East to lay the eastern foundation stone.

== See also ==
- Egg decorating
