= Christopher Forbes =

American publisher

- Born: Morristown, New Jersey, U.S.
- Other name: Kip
- Education: Princeton University
- Occupations: Publisher; art collector; philanthropist
- Father: Malcolm Forbes
- Relatives: Steve Forbes (brother)

Christopher "Kip" Forbes (/fɔːrbz/) is vice chairman of the Forbes Publishing company.

== Life and career ==
He attended St. Mark's School in Southborough, Massachusetts, and Princeton University. His brother is Steve Forbes, who has made multiple runs for the U.S. presidency and written some in-depth political and economic narratives.

In 1974, Forbes married Baroness Astrid of the German Heyl zu Herrnsheim family in Worms/Germany.

Always interested in art and collecting, he worked with his father, Malcolm Forbes restoring the Château de Balleroy in Normandy, France, and Old Battersea House in London, England. Mr. Forbes has written numerous books and catalogues about art and collecting, including Fabergé: The Forbes Collection, co-authored with Robyn Tromeur and published by Hugh Lauter Levin.

=== 1985 wine auction ===
On December 5, 1985, Kip Forbes paid the highest price ever recorded for a single bottle of wine. Hardy Rodenstock (Meinhard Görke) put one of the 'recently discovered' "Th. J." (Thomas Jefferson) bottles up for auction at Christie's in London: a bottle of 1787 Château Lafite engraved "1787 Lafitte Th. J." The bottles had been found in a walled-up old cellar, and were engraved with vintage years from the late eighteenth century. This had in itself been an interesting find for a collector of old wines, but the bottles also were engraved with the initials, "Th. J.", which was taken as an indication that they had belonged to Thomas Jefferson. Jefferson was an active oenophile and wine collector, who spent much time in France during the 1780s and whose interest in wine is well documented.

The auction catalogue simply listed the value as "inestimable", and it was sold for 105,000 pound sterling which, as of 2007, remains the worldwide auction record for a single bottle of wine. Forbes was bidding against Marvin Shanken of Wine Spectator Magazine, with Michael Broadbent handling the gavel at the auction.

Rodenstock is currently in court charged with perpetrating large-scale wine fraud. It is alleged that the Thomas Jefferson bottles are fake, and multiple experts and various pieces of evidence apparently support this conclusion. Rodenstock has refused to allow the German magazine Stern to have the wine's veracity tested at its expense.

A book, The Billionaire's Vinegar, has been published about the affair, although it has been withdrawn from the UK market following legal action by Michael Broadbent. The film rights to both the book and a New Yorker article about the scandal have been purchased.
