= Romanov Tercentenary (Fabergé egg) =

1913 Imperial Fabergé egg

Romanov Tercentenary Fabergé egg
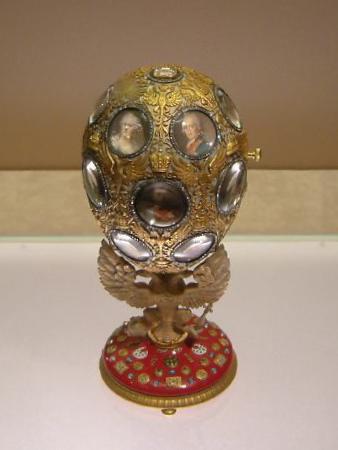
- Romanov Tercentenary Egg
- Year delivered: 1913
- Customer: Nicholas II
- Recipient: Alexandra Fedorovna

Current owner
- Individual or institution: Kremlin Armoury, Moscow

Design and materials
- Workmaster: Henrik Wigström
- Materials used: Gold, silver, diamond, rock crystal, enamel
- Height: 190 mm (7.5 in)
- Width: 78 mm (3.1 in)
- Surprise: Rotating globe of historical and contemporary Russian territories

The Romanov Tercentenary egg is a jewelled Easter egg made under the supervision of the Russian jeweller Peter Carl Fabergé in 1913, for Tsar Nicholas II of Russia. The Fabergé egg was presented by Nicolas II as an Easter gift to his wife, the Tsaritsa Alexandra Fyodorovna. It is currently held in the Kremlin Armoury Museum in Moscow.

== Design ==
The Romanov Tercentenary egg is made of gold, silver, rose-cut and portrait diamonds, turquoise, purpurine, rock crystal, Vitreous enamel and watercolor painting on ivory. It is 190 mm in height and 78 mm in diameter. The egg celebrates the Tercentenary of the Romanov dynasty, three hundred years of Romanov rule from 1613 to 1913. The outside contains eighteen portraits of the Romanov Tsars of Russia. The egg is decorated in a chased gold pattern with double-headed eagles as well as past and present Romanov crowns which frame the portraits of the Tsars. Each miniature portrait, painted by miniaturist Vassily Zuiev, is on ivory and is bordered by rose-cut diamonds. The inside of the egg is opalescent white enamel. The egg sits on a pedestal that represents the Imperial double-headed eagle in gold, with three talons holding the Imperial scepter, orb and Romanov sword. The pedestal is supported by a purpurine base that represents the Russian Imperial shield.

Among the 18 rulers represented are Michael, the first of the Romanov dynasty in 1613, as well as Peter the Great (1682–1725), Catherine the Great (1762–1796), and Nicholas II himself as the final Tsar in 1913.

== Surprise ==
The surprise is a rotating detailed globe made of dark blue enamel, varicolored gold and steel. The globe portrays one hemisphere showing Russian territory under Tsar Michael in 1613, and on the opposite side the Russian territory under Nicholas II in 1913. The dark blue enamel colors areas of the ocean while landmasses are portrayed in colored golds.

== History ==
In May 1913, Nicholas II and Alexandra Fedorovna made a pilgrimage retracing the journey made by Michael Romanov on his way to the throne in 1613. The tercentenary celebrations across Russia were extravagant and well attended by the masses, in spite of Nicholas II's unpopularity since the 1905 Russian Revolution. While traveling the country, Nicholas and Alexandra were so well received by the people that it seemed as if public opinion had turned in their favor. This experience colored Alexandra's perspective throughout the next four years when the monarchy began to crumble during World War I. She refused to believe that the Russian people could turn on them so quickly. Yet, by 1917 the February Revolution would lead to Nicholas' abdication and the family's execution in 1918.

In 1917, the Romanov Tercentenary Egg was confiscated by the Provisional Government during the Russian Revolution, along with many other Imperial treasures. It was transported from the Anichkov Palace to the Kremlin Armoury, Moscow, where it remained. The Romanov Tercentenary Egg is one of ten Faberge Eggs in the collection at the Kremlin Armoury. Others include: Memory of Azov Egg (1881), Bouquet of Lilies Clock egg (1899), Trans-Siberian Railway egg (1900), Clover Leaf egg (1902), Moscow Kremlin egg (1906), Standart egg (1909), Alexander III Equestrian egg (1910), Alexander Palace egg (1908), Steel Military egg (1916).

== See also ==
- Egg decorating
- Tsarevich (Fabergé egg)
- Red Cross with Imperial Portraits
- Romanov Tercentenary
