= Alexander Palace (Fabergé egg) =

1908 Imperial Fabergé egg

Alexander Palace Fabergé egg
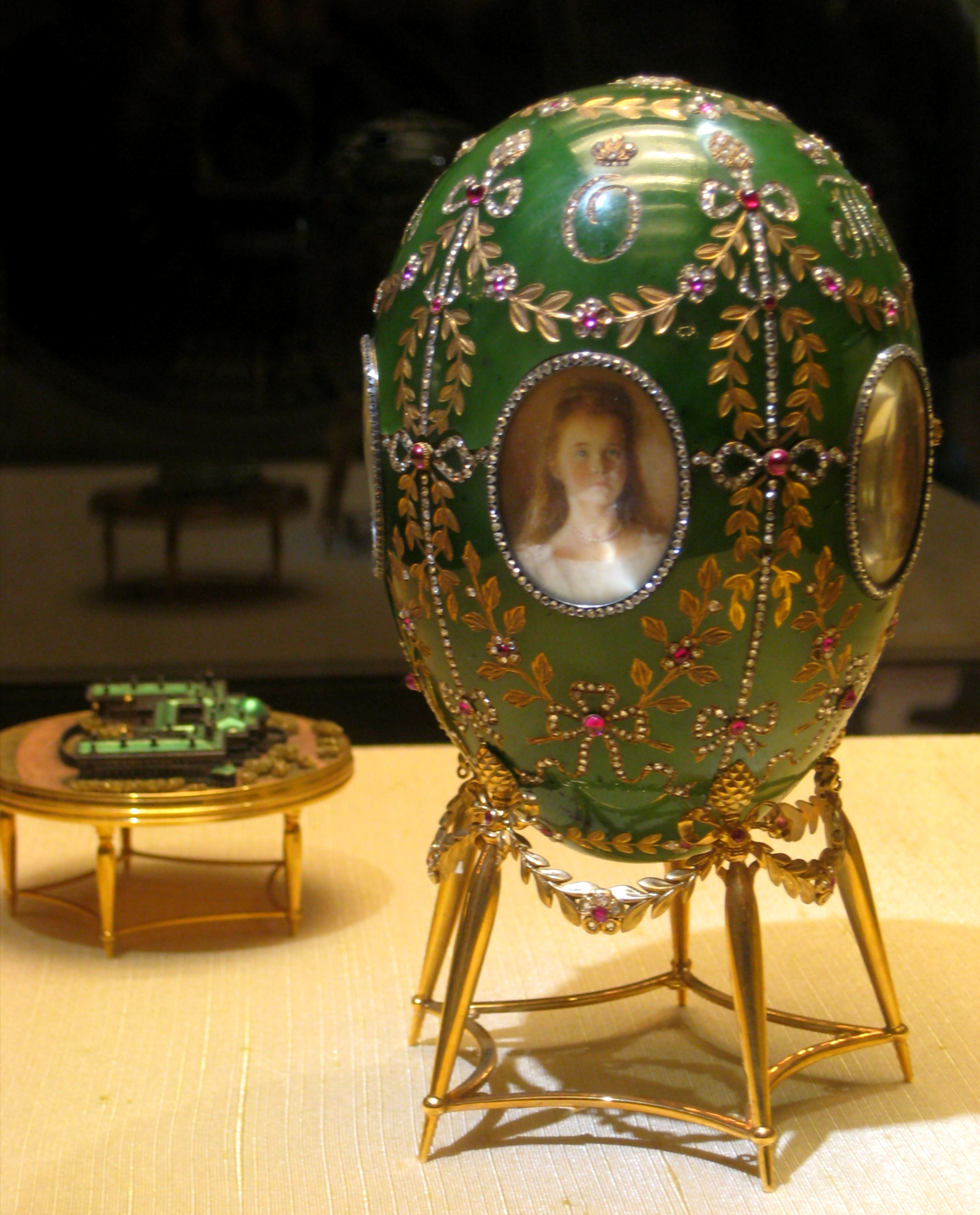
- The egg (with surprise out) on a matching stand made in 1989
- Year delivered: 1908
- Customer: Nicholas II
- Recipient: Alexandra Fedorovna

Current owner
- Individual or institution: Kremlin Armoury

Design and materials
- Workmaster: Henrik Wigström
- Materials used: Nephrite, gold, diamond, ruby, ivory
- Height: 110 millimetres (4.3 in)
- Width: 68 millimetres (2.7 in)
- Surprise: Miniature Alexander Palace

The Alexander Palace egg is a jewelled Easter egg made under the supervision of the Russian jeweler Peter Carl Fabergé in 1908, for the then Tsar of Russia, Nicholas II. Nicholas presented it as an Easter gift to his wife, Alexandra Fyodorovna. It is held in the Kremlin Armoury Museum in Moscow, and it is one of the few imperial Fabergé eggs that were never sold after the Russian Revolution.

== Design ==
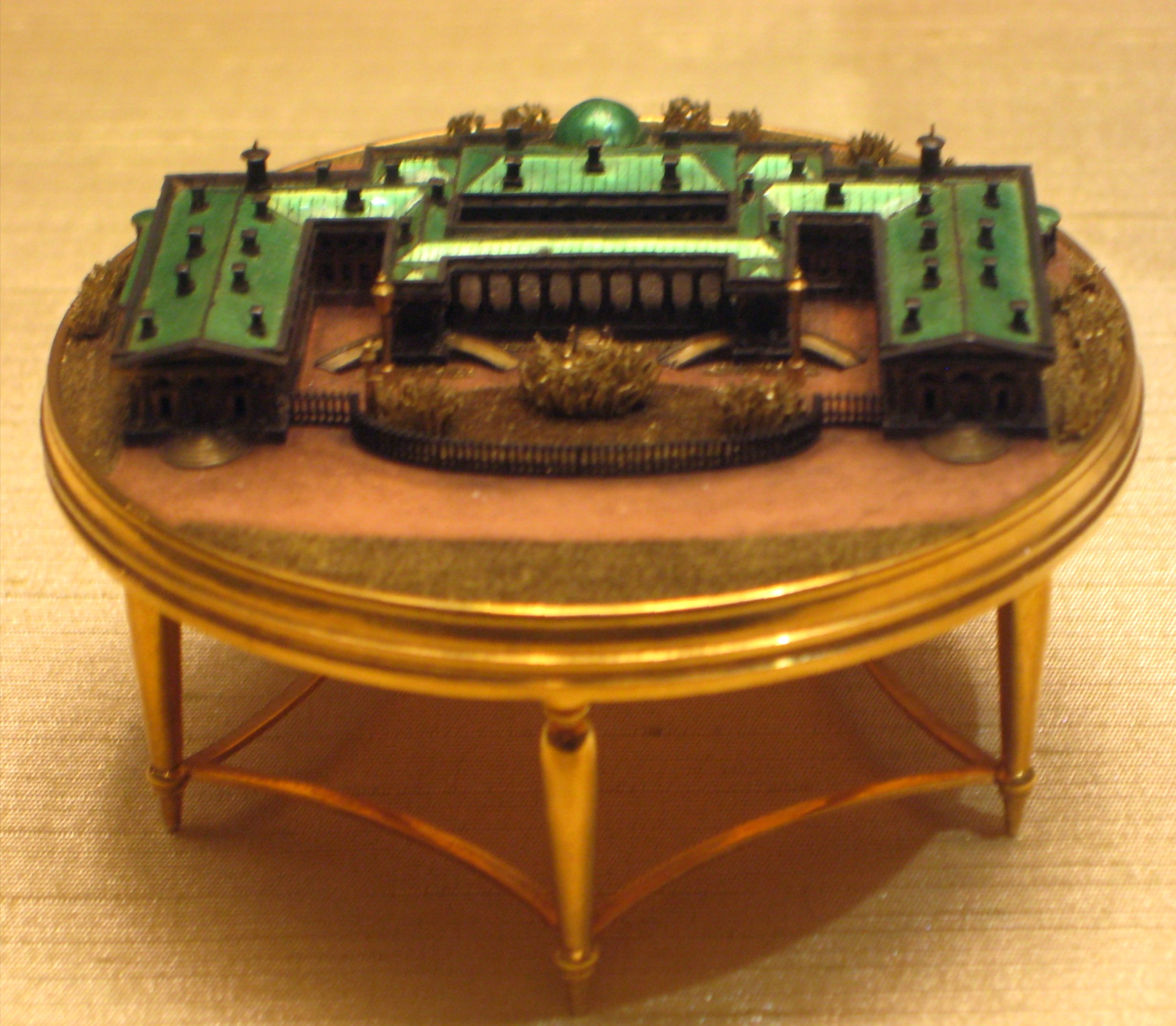
The surprise is a miniature model of the Alexander Palace

The Alexander Palace egg is made of Siberian nephrite, diamonds, gold, rubies and miniature watercolor paintings on ivory. The outside of the egg contains five miniature watercolor portraits of the children of Nicholas II and Empress Alexandra: Olga, Tatiana, Maria, and Anastasia and the Tsarevitch Alexei. Above each portrait is a diamond monogrammed initial of each child's first name. On the reverse of each portrait, visible only from the inside of the egg, is the date of birth of each child, including Olga- November 3, 1895, Tatiana- May 29, 1897, Maria- June 14, 1899, Anastasia- June 5, 1901, Alexei- July 30, 1904. The remainder of the egg's surface is divided by five vertical lines, studded with diamonds and connected with one another by gold garlands inlaid with rose and ruby flowers. The dividing line between the upper and lower sections of the egg also have golden leaves, rubies and diamonds, together with two triangular diamonds with Alexandra's initials, AF.

The original stand is lost, so a matching stand was made in 1989 by the Moscow Experimental Jewellery Factory by S. Bugrovym, based on a sketch by T. D. Zharkovoj.

== Surprise ==
The surprise is a detailed replica of the Alexander Palace, the Russian Imperial family's favorite residence in Tsarskoye Selo. The tiny replica also details the adjoining gardens of the palace. The miniature is made of tinted gold and enamel. The windows are made of rock crystal, the roof of enameled light green. The palace replica is placed on a gold table with five narrow high legs and can be removed from the egg. The base of the replica has an engraved inscription that reads, "The Palace at Tsarkoye Selo."

== History ==
The Alexander Palace egg was commissioned by Nicholas II in 1908 and presented to Alexandra. It was purchased for 12,300 rubles. From 1913 until 1916 it remained at the Alexander Palace in Alexandra Fedorovna’s Mauve Sitting Room 1913-1916. In 1917 it was confiscated by Kerensky's army during the Russian Revolution, along with many other Imperial treasures. It was transported from the Anichkov Palace to the Kremlin Armoury, where it remained. The Alexander Palace Egg is one of ten Faberge Eggs in the collection at the Kremlin Armoury, Moscow. Others include: Memory of Azov Egg (1881), Bouquet of Lilies Clock egg (1899), Trans-Siberian Railway egg (1900), Clover Leaf egg (1902), Moscow Kremlin egg (1906), Standart egg (1909), Alexander III Equestrian egg (1910), Romanov Tercentenary egg (1913), Steel Military egg (1916).

== See also ==
- Objet d'art
