= Creaking Pagoda =

Small summer house located in Tsarskoe Selo, Russia

Coordinates: 59°42′49″N 30°23′13″E

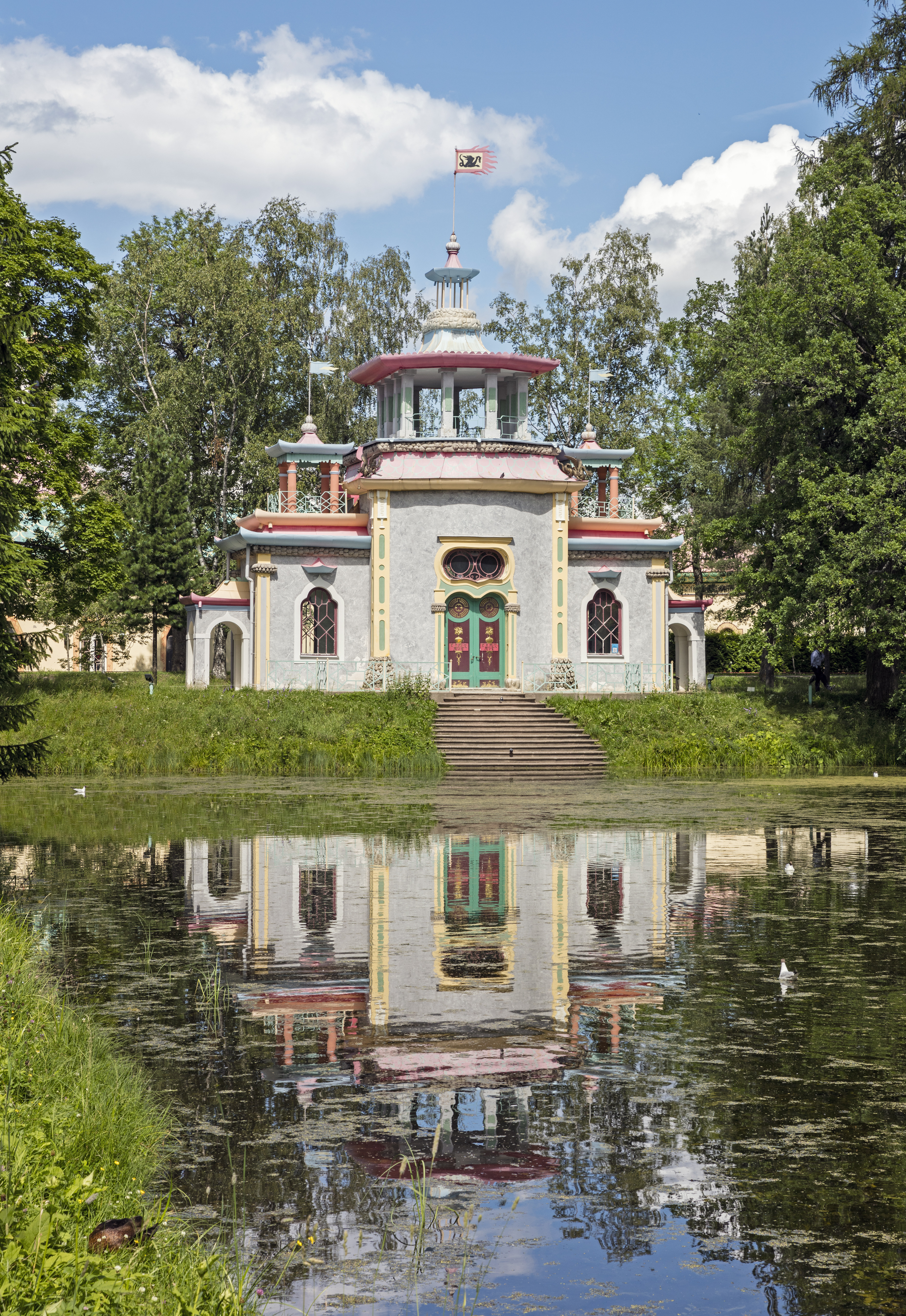
The Creaking Pagoda in 2016

The Creaking Pagoda (Скрипучая беседка), also known as the Chinese Summer House (Китайская беседка), is a small summer house located between two ponds in Tsarskoe Selo, Russia. It stands in on the boundary separating the Catherine Park of the baroque Catherine Palace and the New Garden of the Alexander Park of the neoclassical Alexander Palace.

The pagoda is a long but narrow folly that resulted from the 18th-century taste for Chinoiserie, reflected in other buildings constructed for Catherine the Great. It was constructed near the Chinese Village in 1778 to 1786, designed by Georg von Veldten, also known as Yury Velten, possibly with input from Antonio Rinaldi. Construction lasted from 1778 to 1786. The walls are decorated with figures of dragons and other stylized Chinese motifs. There are gilded wooden sculptures of dragons at the corners of the roof, carrying bells in their mouths, and steps from the main entrance lead down to the water. The structure fell into disrepair in the 19th and 20th centuries, and was damaged in the Second World War, but it was restored from 1954 to 1956. Further restoration work in the 1990s, including a new roof, before the 200th anniversary of Tsarskoe Selo. Chinese characters for "Welcome" were added on the main door.

The name of the structure refers to a characteristic sound produced by a metal weathervane, shaped like a banner, on the top of the structure which creaks when it is turned by the wind.

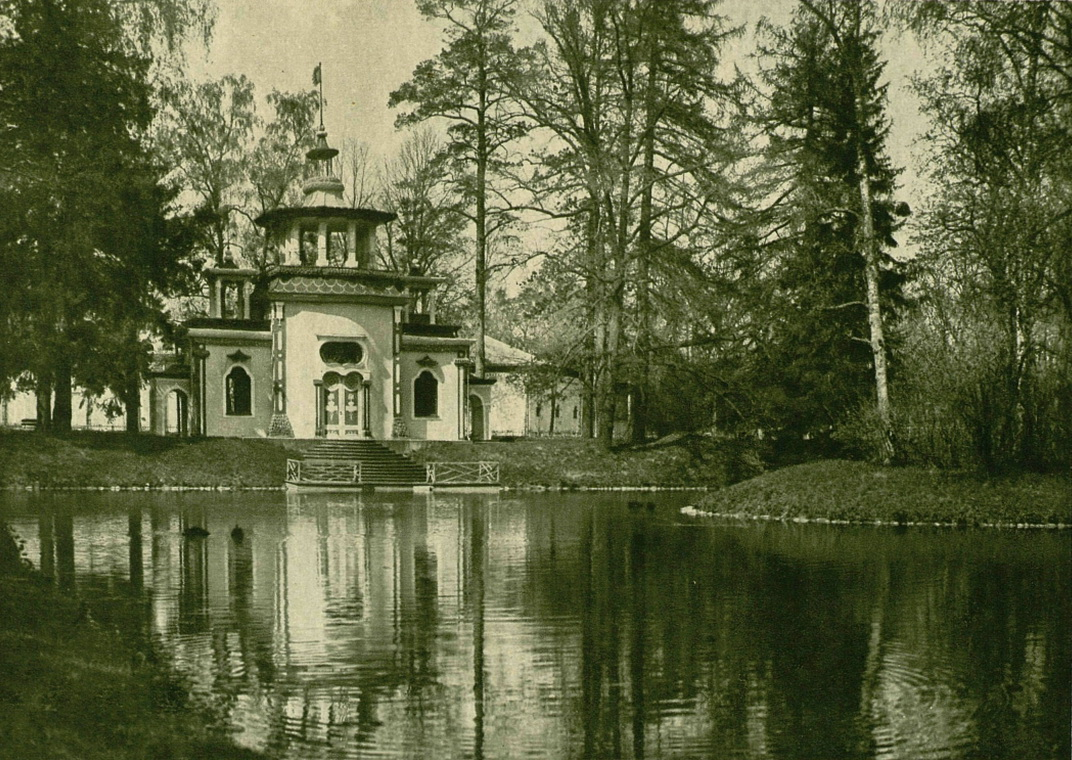
In 1912

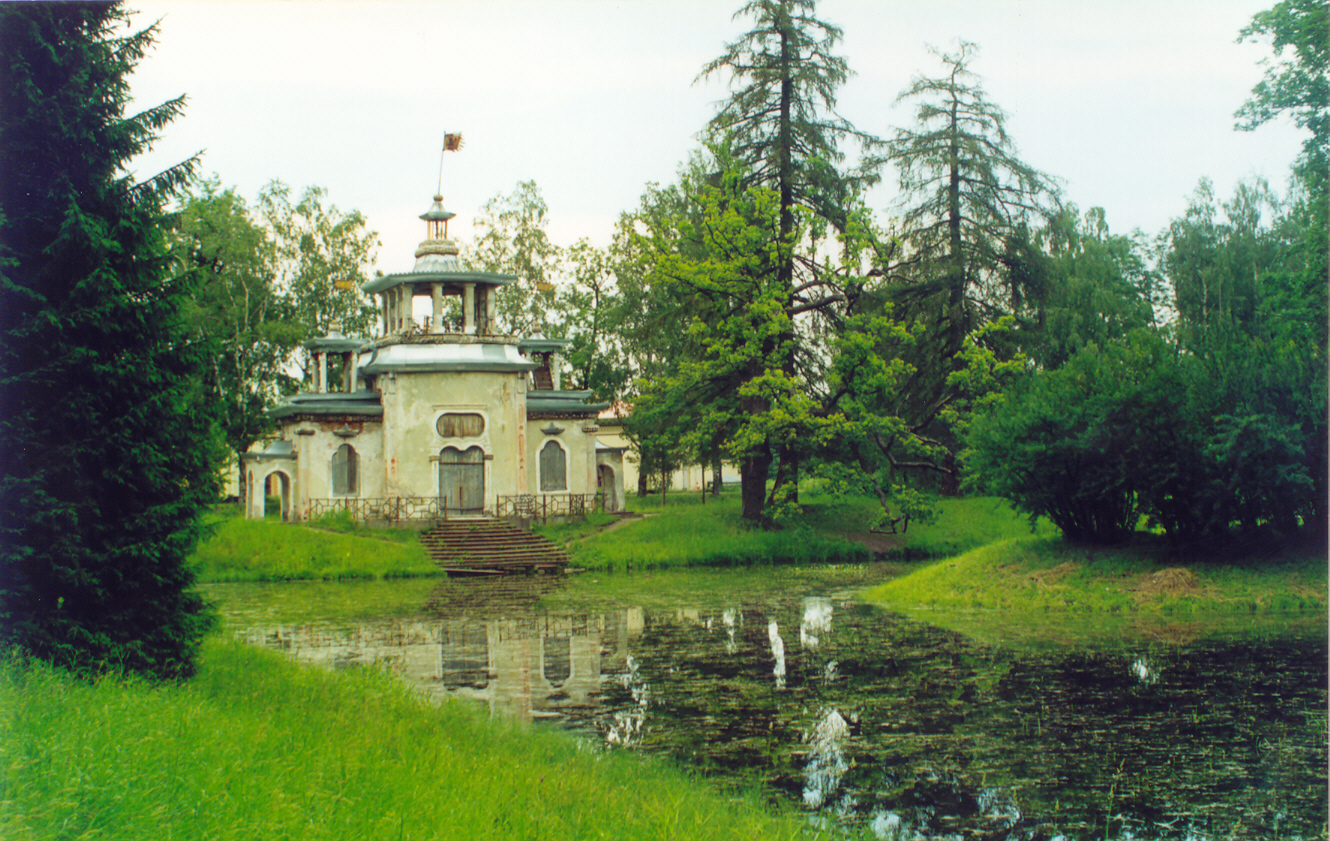
In 2004, before the most recent restoration was completed

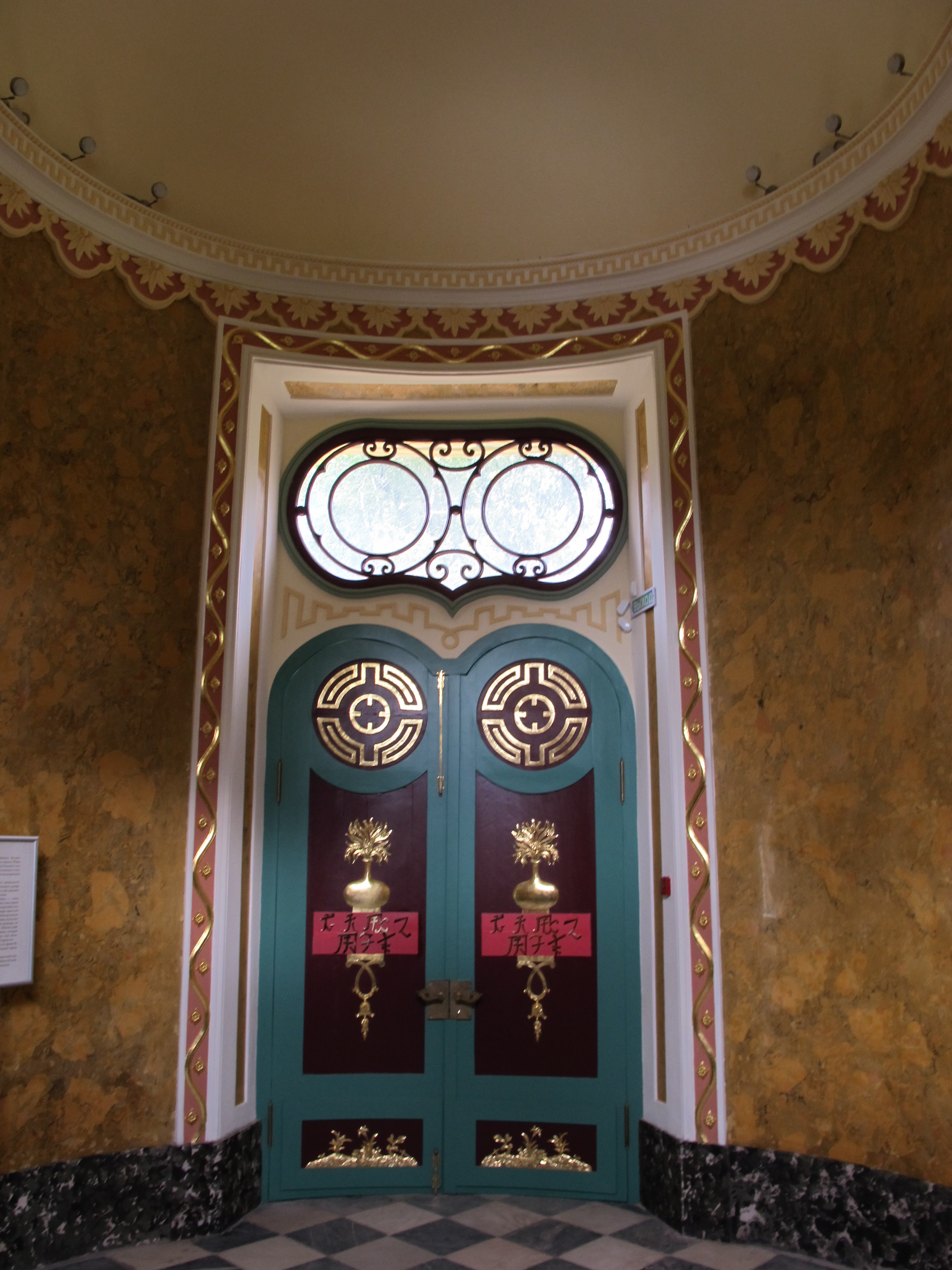
One of the doors, from the inside, in 2011

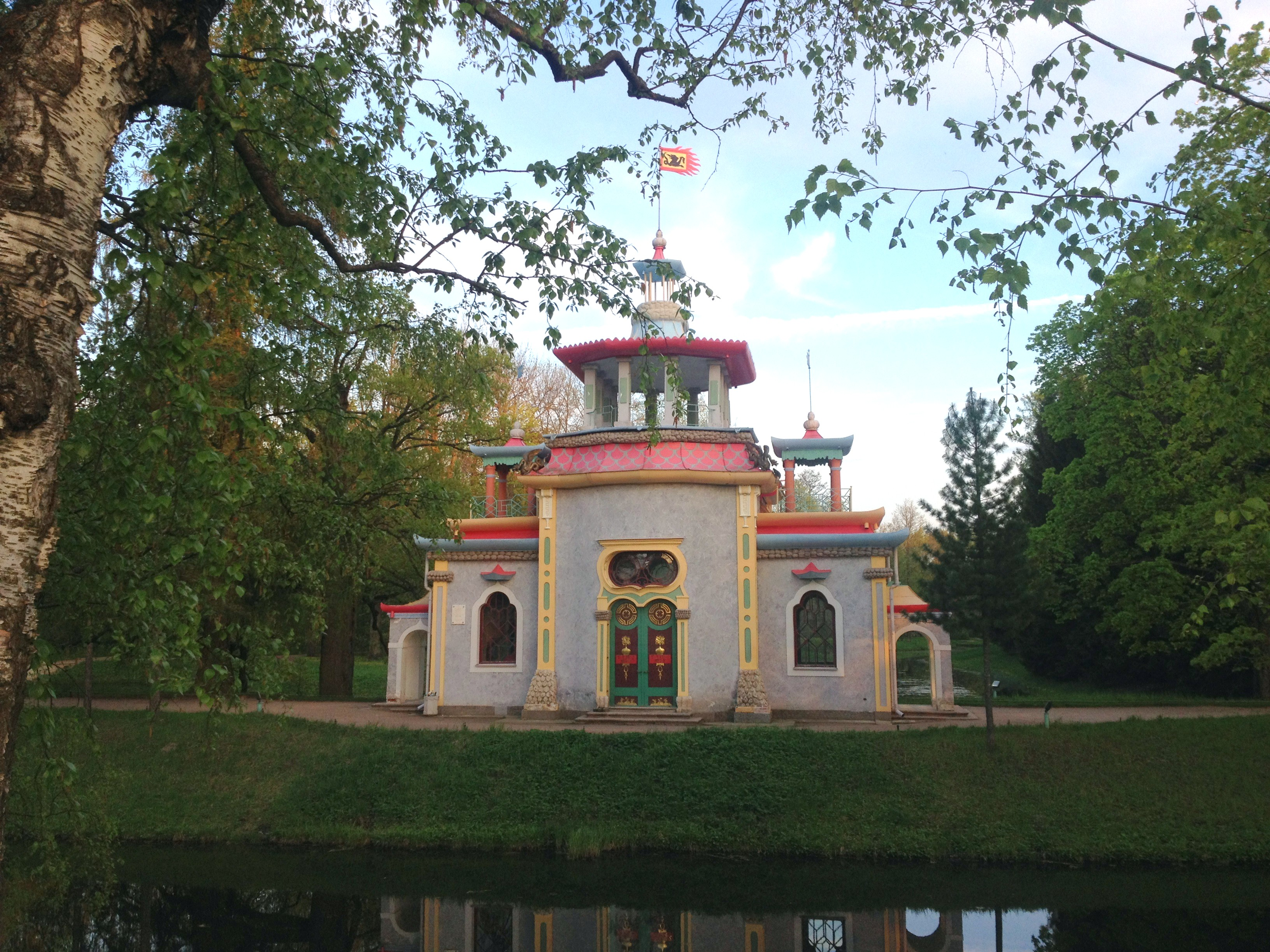
In 2014

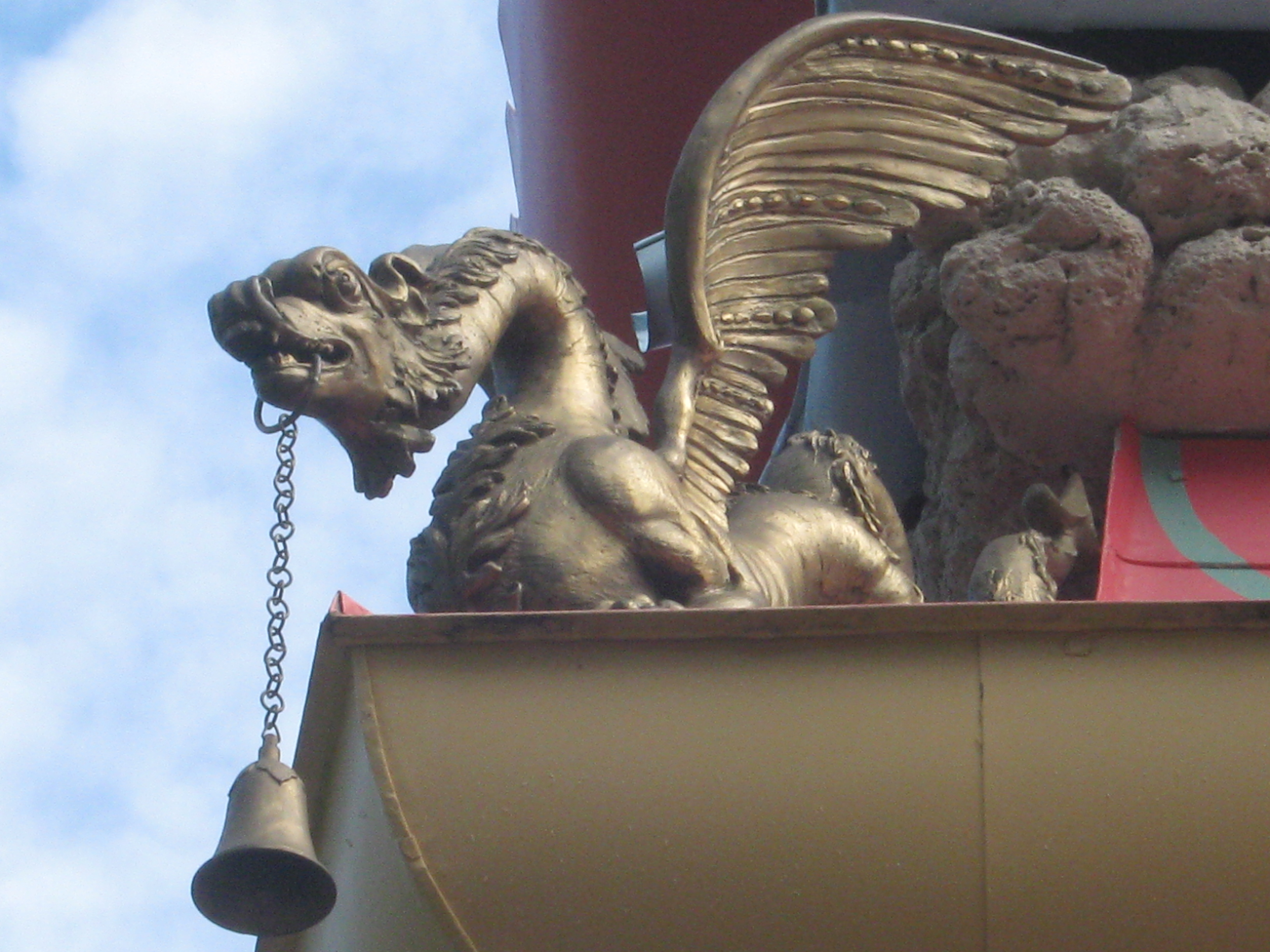
Dragons at the corners of the roof
