= Large Chinese Bridge =

Bridge in Saint Petersburg, Russia

Coordinates: 59°42′59″N 30°23′11″E

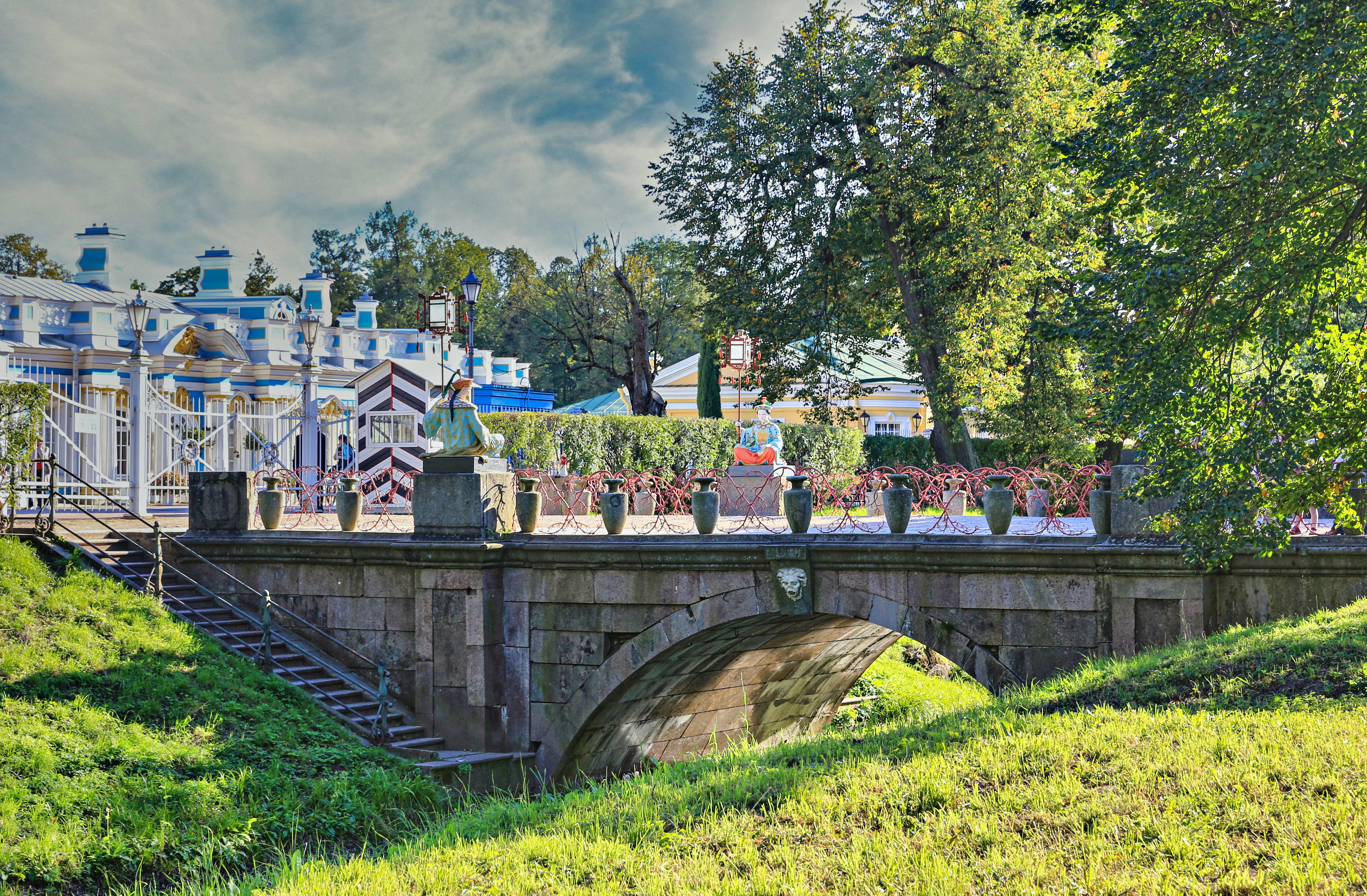
Large Chinese Bridge

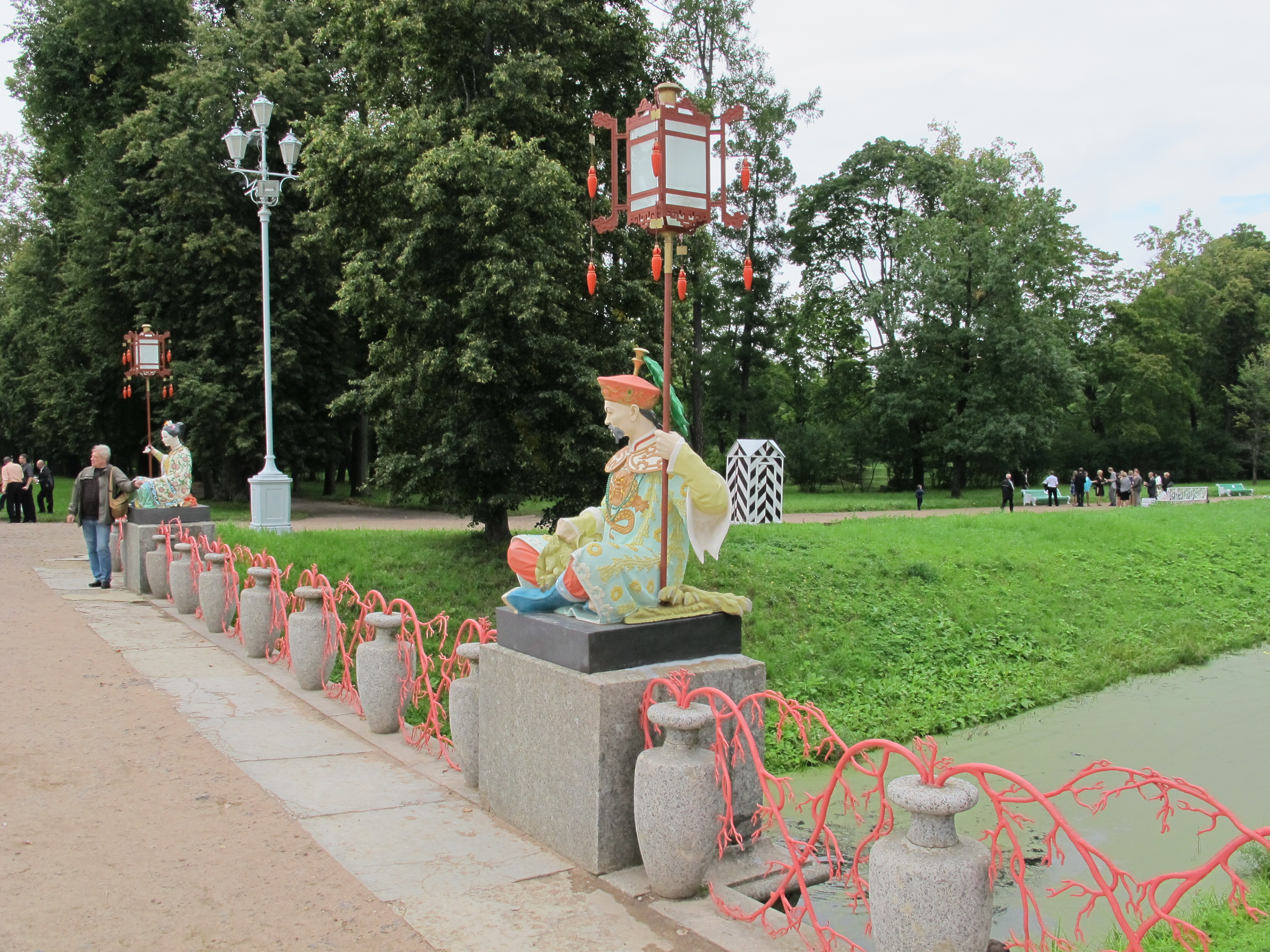
Statue and railing details

The Large Chinese Bridge (Russian: Большой Китайский мост) is a small bridge over the Krestovy Channel located in the Chinese Village in the Alexander Park of Tsarskoye Selo 25 km south of the centre of Saint Petersburg. The bridge is located near the Chinese Theatre, opposite the central gates of the Catherine Palace. It is one of the entrances to Alexander Park. The bridge is named Large to distinguish it from two Small (or Iron) Chinese Bridges located in the park.

The Large Chinese Bridge was commissioned by Catherine the Great as part of her plan to create a Chinoiserie in her park. Catherine ordered Antonio Rinaldi and Charles Cameron to model the village after a Chinese engraving from her personal collection. The village was expected to consist of 18 stylized Chinese houses (only ten were completed), shadowed by an octagonal domed observatory (not completed).

The Large Chinese Bridge is constructed out of pink granite. The most original features of the bridge are the low wall barriers stylishly decorated with tall, granite vases which have intertwining branches of red iron "coral" iron. Originally, in addition to the vases and iron coral, the Large Chinese Bridge was decorated with four painted plaster Chinese figures sitting on short pedestals and holding Chinese lanterns on long poles. However, these Chinese figures have not survived to the present day. To the left of the Large Chinese Bridge stand two Small Chinese bridges leading to the Chinese Village. At first these little bridges constructed by Charles Cameron in 1781 were wooden. In 1786 they were replaced with iron ones forged at the Sestroretsk Armory.

The Large Chinese Bridge is one of three bridges that lead to the village. The Dragon Bridge, and the Large Chinese Bridge were completed in 1785 and the Cross-Shaped Bridge (Krestovoy Most) had been erected six years earlier.

Catherine's death in 1796 led to the village being suspended until 1818 when Alexander I asked Vasily Stasov to remodel the village to provide accommodation for his guests. Although much of the original decor was removed, the renovated village provided a place to live for such important visitors.
