= Moscow Kremlin (Fabergé egg) =

1906 Imperial Fabergé egg

Moscow Kremlin Egg Fabergé egg
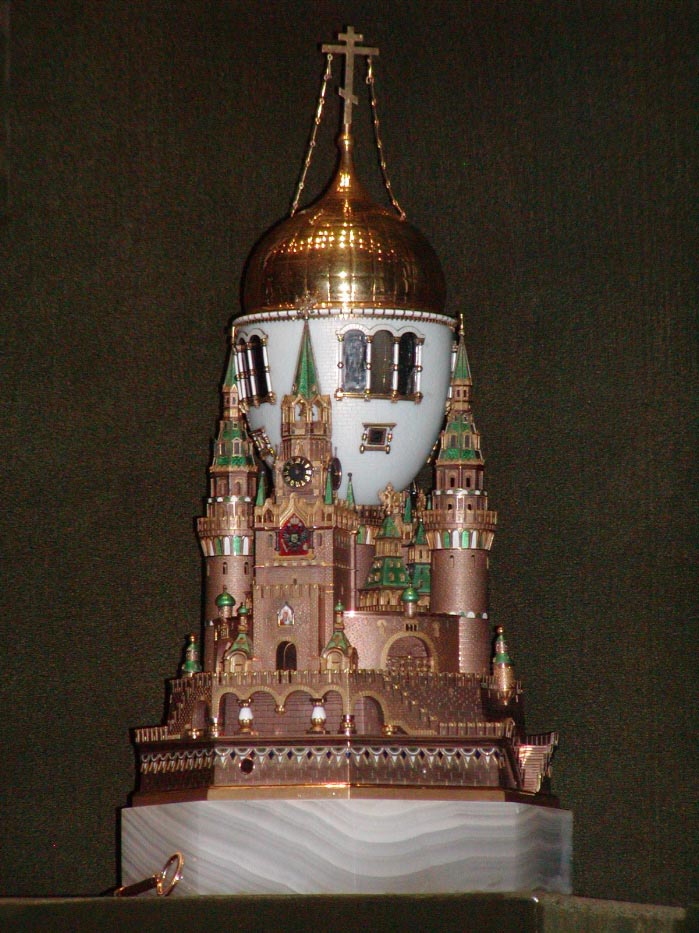
- Year delivered: 1906
- Customer: Nicholas II
- Recipient: Alexandra Feodorovna

Current owner
- Individual or institution: Kremlin Armoury

Design and materials
- Materials used: Onyx, gold, enamel, glass
- Height: 361 millimetres (14.2 in)
- Width: 185 millimetres (7.3 in)
- Surprise: Music box

The Uspenski Cathedral egg or Moscow Kremlin egg is a jewelled Easter egg made under the supervision of the Russian jeweller Peter Carl Fabergé in 1906 for Tsar Nicholas II of Russia. It was presented by Nicolas II as an Easter gift to his wife, the Czarina Alexandra Fyodorovna. It is currently held in the Kremlin Armoury Museum in Moscow, and it is one of the few imperial Fabergé eggs that were never sold after the Russian Revolution.

== Design ==
The Moscow Kremlin egg is by far the largest of the Fabergé eggs and was inspired by the architecture of the Dormition Cathedral, Moscow (Uspenski) in Moscow. This cathedral was where all the Tsars of Russia were crowned, including Nicholas II himself.

The cathedral dome (in white opalescent vitreous enamel) is removable, and the remarkably crafted interior of the church can be seen. Its carpets, tiny enameled icons and high altar on an oval glass plate are made visible through four triple windows, surmounted by a gold cupola and flanked by two square, two circular stylized turrets, the former based on the Spassky Tower. The tower bears the coat of arms of the Russian Empire and the coat of arms of Moscow, inset with 'chiming clocks'. It stands on a crenellated gold base and octagonal white onyx plinth designed as a pyramid, and built of more smaller pyramids

== Surprise ==
The surprise in this egg is music. The base of the egg contains a gold music box that plays two cherubim chants, traditional Easter hymns can be played when a clockwork mechanism is wound up by a gold key. One of the hymns is the "Izhe Khveruvimy" (Cherubic Hymn #7 by D. Bortnyansky), a favorite hymn of Nicholas II.

== History ==
The egg commemorates the return to Moscow of the royal couple Nicholas II and Alexandra Fyodorovna in 1903. They had tended to avoid the historical capital due to its ill-omened association with a riot during Nicholas's coronation, where hundreds of Moscovites were crushed to death. The egg itself was supposed to be presented in 1904 as engraved at the foot in white enamel on a round gold plate is the date. But the delivery was delayed because of the Russo-Japanese War (1904–1905). This was followed by the assassination in the Kremlin of Nicholas' favorite uncle and brother-in-law, Grand Duke Sergei Alexandrovich. So instead the egg was only presented for Easter, 1906. The egg was kept in the Maple Room in the Alexander Palace.

== See also ==
- Egg decorating
