= Steel Military (Fabergé egg) =

1916 Imperial Fabergé egg

Steel Military Fabergé egg
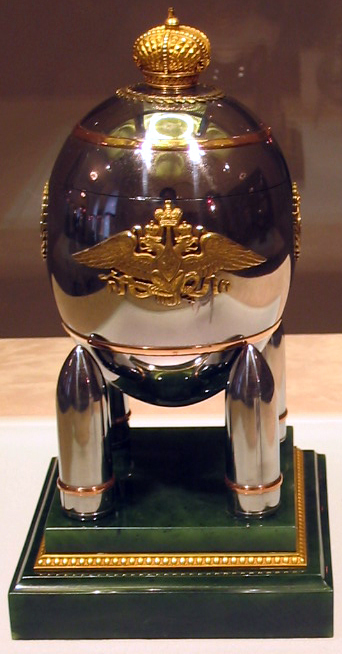
- Year delivered: 1916
- Customer: Nicholas II
- Recipient: Alexandra Fyodorovna

Current owner
- Individual or institution: Kremlin Armoury

Design and materials
- Workmaster: Henrik Wigström
- Materials used: Gold, steel, jade, white enamel, silk, and velvet
- Height: 101 millimetres (4.0 in)
- Surprise: An easel holding a watercolor painting done on ivory

The Steel Military egg is one of a series of approximately 50 Russian jewelled Easter eggs created under the supervision of the Russian jeweller Peter Carl Fabergé. This particular egg was delivered to Alexandra Fyodorovna, the Russian Tsarina, on Easter Eve of 1916 on behalf of the last Tsar of Russia, Nicholas II by Fabergé's son Eugène while Nicholas II was away at the Russian front of World War I; Carl Fabergé was himself busy delivering the other Easter egg for 1916, the Order of St. George Egg, to Nicholas's mother, the Dowager Empress Maria. It is one of only ten Imperial Fabergé eggs that were not sold following the Russian Revolution and subsequent execution of the immediate Imperial Romanov family, and is now held in the collection of the Kremlin Armoury.

== Design ==
It was designed by one of Carl Fabergé's relatives, Gustav Shkilter, and manufactured mostly in the Putilovskii Steel Plant which was well known for the quality of its steel.

== Craftsmanship ==
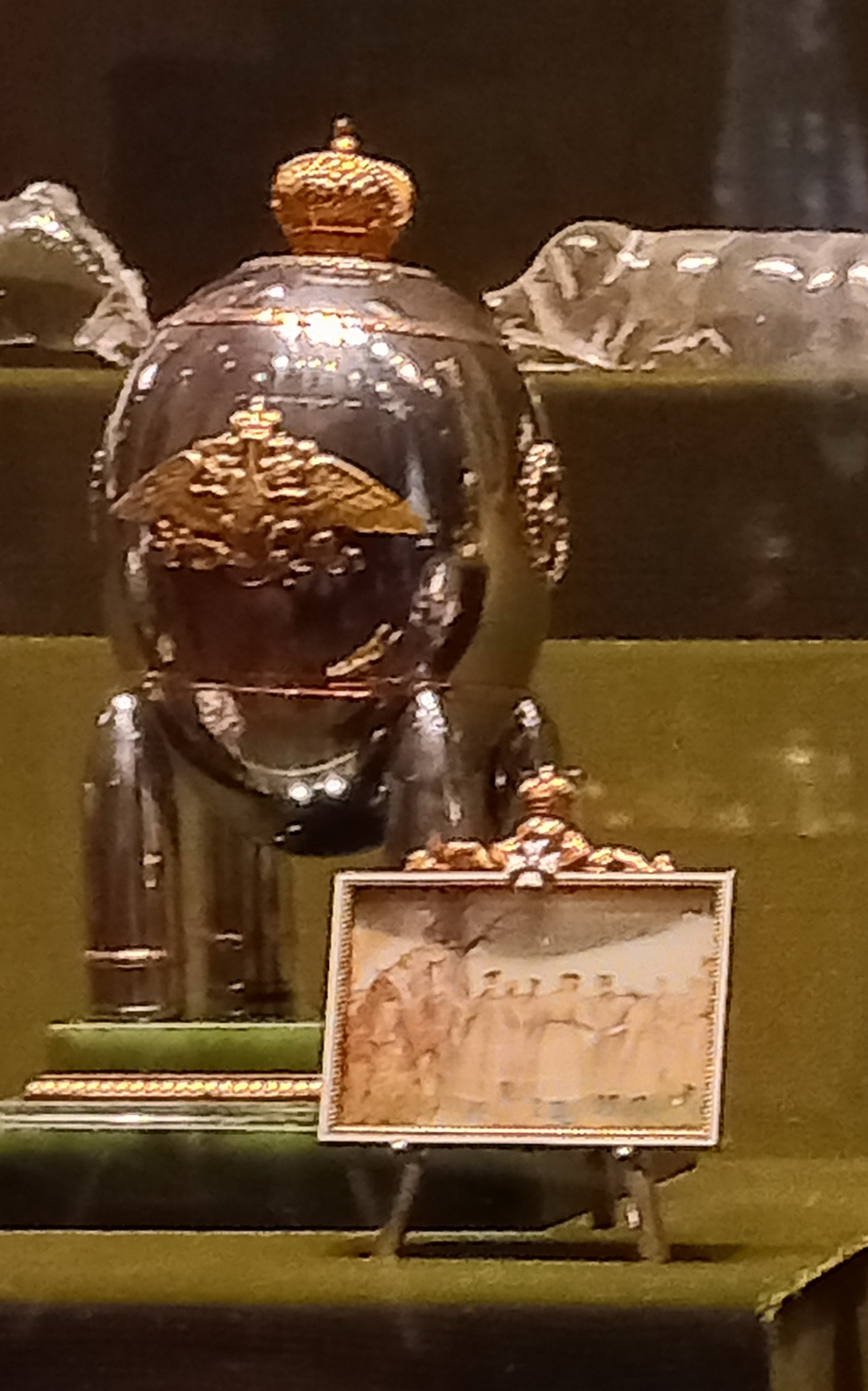
The egg and its surprise.

The exterior of the egg is made of gold and steel— unlike many previous eggs, the exterior had no gemstones set in it anywhere— and was once coated in vitreous enamel, while the interior is made of silk and velvet. The egg stands on a base of jade and is supported by four steel artillery shells. The "surprise" fitting within it is a miniature painting by Vassilii Zuiev on an easel made of gold and steel. The easel is coated in vitreous enamel, and the frame of the painting is lined with diamonds. The painting depicts the Tsar and his teenage son, the Tsarevich Alexei, in heavy Russian overcoats poring over maps with eight senior Russian officers next to a tree and a pair of horses at the front of the Great War.

As such Easter gifts between the Tsar and Tsarina went, the Steel Military egg is sometimes considered banal and kitsch in its austere style and comparatively bland, mostly colorless appearance, especially once the blackened surface had been polished to resemble chrome. Much of this is a reflection not of a shift in Fabergé's artistic style or intent but rather of the dwindling resources and workmen that Fabergé still had at his disposal to create the egg— it was the last that his workshop successfully created and delivered to the Tsarina before the Tsar was deposed, the Russian government collapsed, and the nation entered financial destitution. Although Fabergé would go on to manufacture two more eggs for 1917, they would not be successfully delivered to their intended recipients and Fabergé would leave Russia for Germany in 1918, bitter and frustrated at having been paid for neither and his workshop having been completely nationalized by the Bolsheviks.

== Alterations ==
Originally the steel of the egg was blackened all over. Not long after its delivery, however, it began to rust and the black layer deteriorated (an evaluation of the egg done by Christie's in 1927 also noted that the artillery shells showed definite rust damage). As a result, the steel was polished to halt this process, and it is now a mirror-silver color.

== In fiction ==
The Steel Military Egg appears in The Strangelove Gambit, a Nikolai Dante novel by David Bishop.

== See also ==
- Objet d'art

== Sources ==
- Faber, Toby (2008). Faberge's Eggs: The Extraordinary Story of the Masterpieces That Outlived an Empire. Random House. ISBN 978-1-4000-6550-9.
- Forbes, Christopher; Prinz von Hohenzollern, Johann Georg (1990). FABERGE; The Imperial Eggs. Prestel. ASIN B000YA9GOM.
- Lowes, Will (2001). Fabergé Eggs: A Retrospective Encyclopedia. Scarecrow Press. ISBN 0-8108-3946-6.
- Snowman, A Kenneth (1988). Carl Faberge: Goldsmith to the Imperial Court of Russia. Gramercy. ISBN 0-517-40502-4.
