= Bouquet of Lilies Clock (Fabergé egg) =

1899 Imperial Fabergé egg

Bouquet of Lilies Clock Fabergé egg
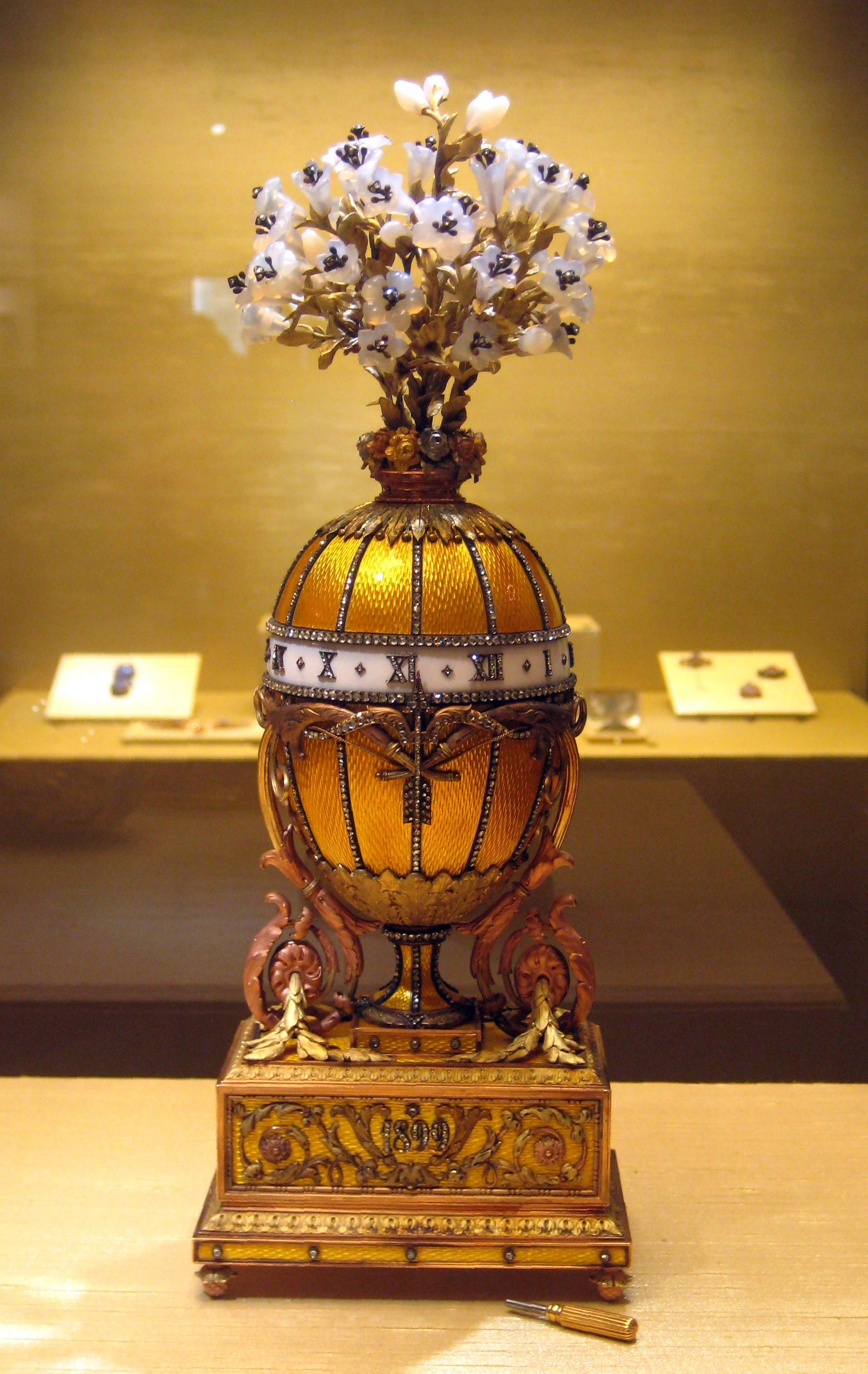
- Year delivered: 1899
- Customer: Nicholas II
- Recipient: Alexandra Fyodorovna

Current owner
- Individual or institution: Kremlin Armoury, Moscow
- Year of acquisition: 1927

Design and materials
- Workmaster: Michael Perkhin
- Materials used: Onyx, diamonds, gold, silver, platinum
- Height: 270 millimetres (11 in)
- Surprise: Ruby pendant with rose-cut diamonds (missing)

The Bouquet of Lilies Clock egg (or the Madonna Lily Clock egg) is a jewelled Easter egg made under the supervision of the Russian jeweller Peter Carl Fabergé in 1899 for Tsar Nicholas II as an Easter gift to his wife, the Tsaritsa Alexandra Fyodorovna. It is currently held in the Kremlin Armoury Museum in Moscow, and it is one of the few imperial Fabergé eggs that were never sold after the Russian Revolution.

== Design ==
The Bouquet of Lilies Clock egg is one of the larger Fabergé eggs. The egg-shaped clock and its rectangular pedestal are decorated with translucent enamel on a guilloché background. The body of the clock is divided into twelve parts which are outlined in diamond-studded stripes. The belt of the dial which revolves around the perimeter of the egg is enameled white with twelve Roman numerals set in diamonds. The hours are indicated by a diamond clock hand shaped like the head of an arrow in a drawn bow. The hand is fixed to an immobile onyx base. The varicolored gold base itself is decorated with rosettes and the date of its manufacture, 1899, is set in diamonds. It is designed as a vase with red-gold scrolls serving as extra supports at either side. A gold key was used to wind the mechanism.

The clock is crowned with a bouquet of Madonna lilies, carved from onyx. The pistils of the flowers are set with three small rose diamonds, and the leaves and stems are of tinted gold. The egg uses the language of flowers which was well known at the time. The roses were symbols of love and the lilies were a symbol of purity and innocence.

== Surprise ==
The surprise from this egg is currently missing, but from contemporary photographs it is known to have been a ruby pendant with rose-cut diamonds.

== See also ==
- Egg decorating
