= Standart Yacht (Fabergé egg) =

1909 Imperial Fabergé egg

Standart Yacht Fabergé egg
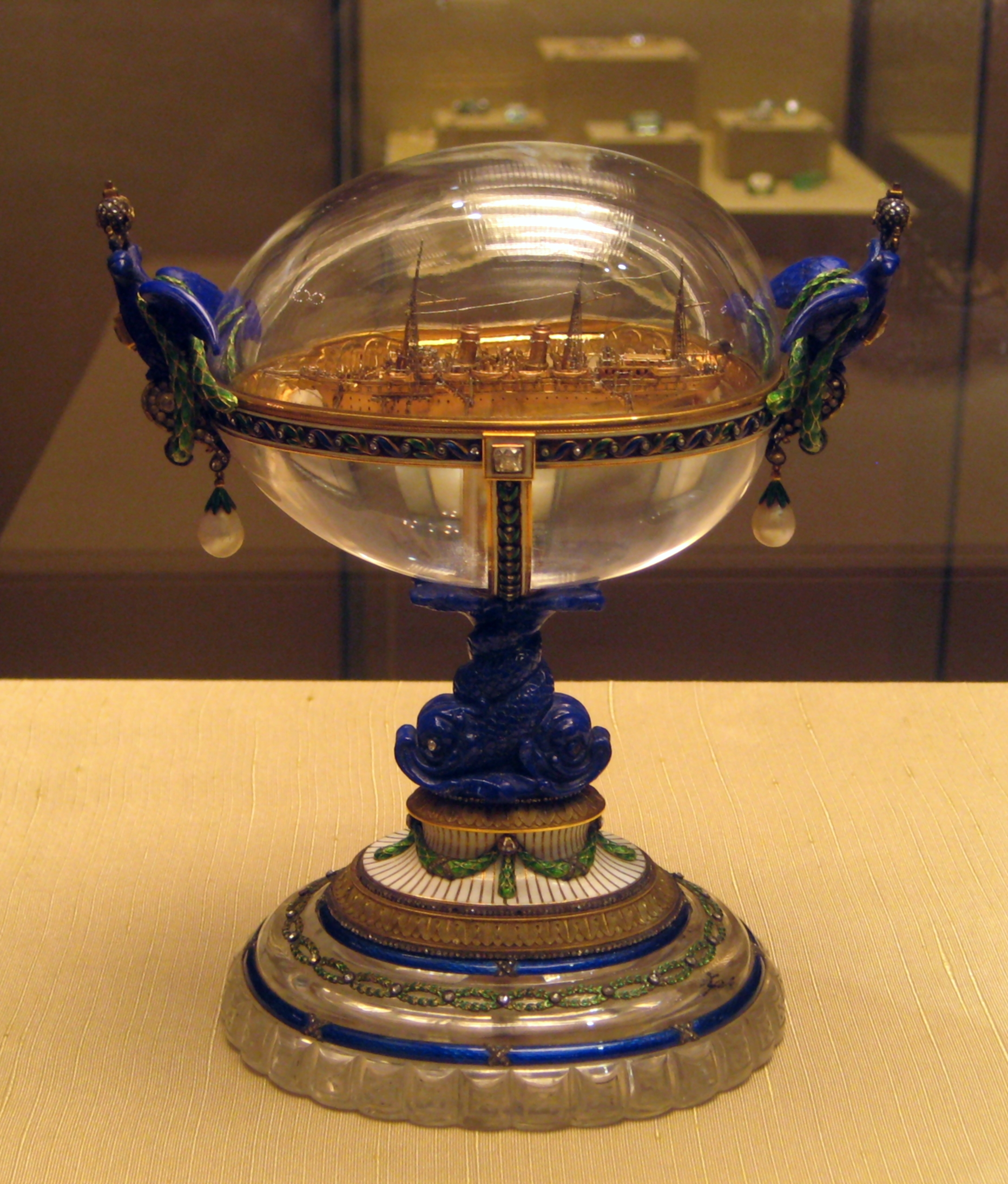
- Standart Yacht Egg
- Year delivered: 1909
- Customer: Nicholas II
- Recipient: Alexandra Fyodorovna

Current owner
- Individual or institution: Kremlin Armoury, Moscow

Design and materials
- Workmaster: Henrik Wigström
- Materials used: Gold, diamond, pearl, lapis lazuli, crystal
- Height: 153 millimetres (6.0 in)
- Surprise: Replica of the Standart Yacht

The Standart Yacht egg is a jewelled Easter egg made under the supervision of the Russian jeweller Peter Carl Fabergé in 1909 for Tsar Nicholas II of Russia. It was presented by Nicolas II as an Easter gift to his wife, the Czarina Alexandra Fyodorovna. It is currently held in the Kremlin Armoury Museum in Moscow, and it is one of the few imperial Fabergé eggs that were never sold after the Russian Revolution.

== Design ==
The Standart Yacht Leaf Egg is a transparent hollowed-out rock crystal egg, mounted horizontally, with a gold band with inlaid leaves of green enamel and small diamonds marking the separation point between upper and lower halves, which bears the inscription "Standart 1909". A crowned lapis lazuli eagle is perched on either side of the egg and a large pear-shaped pearl hangs from each. The shaft consists of two lapis lazuli dolphins with intertwined tails. It is on an ornate stand with classical overtones, made from gold, pearls, and enamel.

== Surprise ==
The surprise is a golden replica of the Imperial Yacht, the Standart Yacht, made of gold and platinum, and coated in vitreous enamel. The model rests on a carved bed of crystal representing the ocean, but can be removed from the egg.

== History ==
The c5,500 ton Standart was commissioned by Tsar Alexander III in Copenhagen. It was launched in 1895 and was 116 meters long, which made it the largest yacht in the world at that time. Outfitted with ornate fixtures, including mahogany paneling, crystal chandeliers, and other amenities (including a stable with a cow to provide the imperial children with fresh milk) it was a floating palace for the Russian Imperial Family for their vacations in the Baltic Sea. The Russian Imperial Family was vacationing on the Standart during the summer of 1914, when they received the news of the assassination of Archduke Franz Ferdinand, in Sarajevo, marking the start of World War I.

== See also ==
- Egg decorating
