= Chinese Village (Tsarskoe Selo) =

Buildings in Tsarskoye Selo, Russia

Coordinates: 59°42′53″N 30°23′9″E

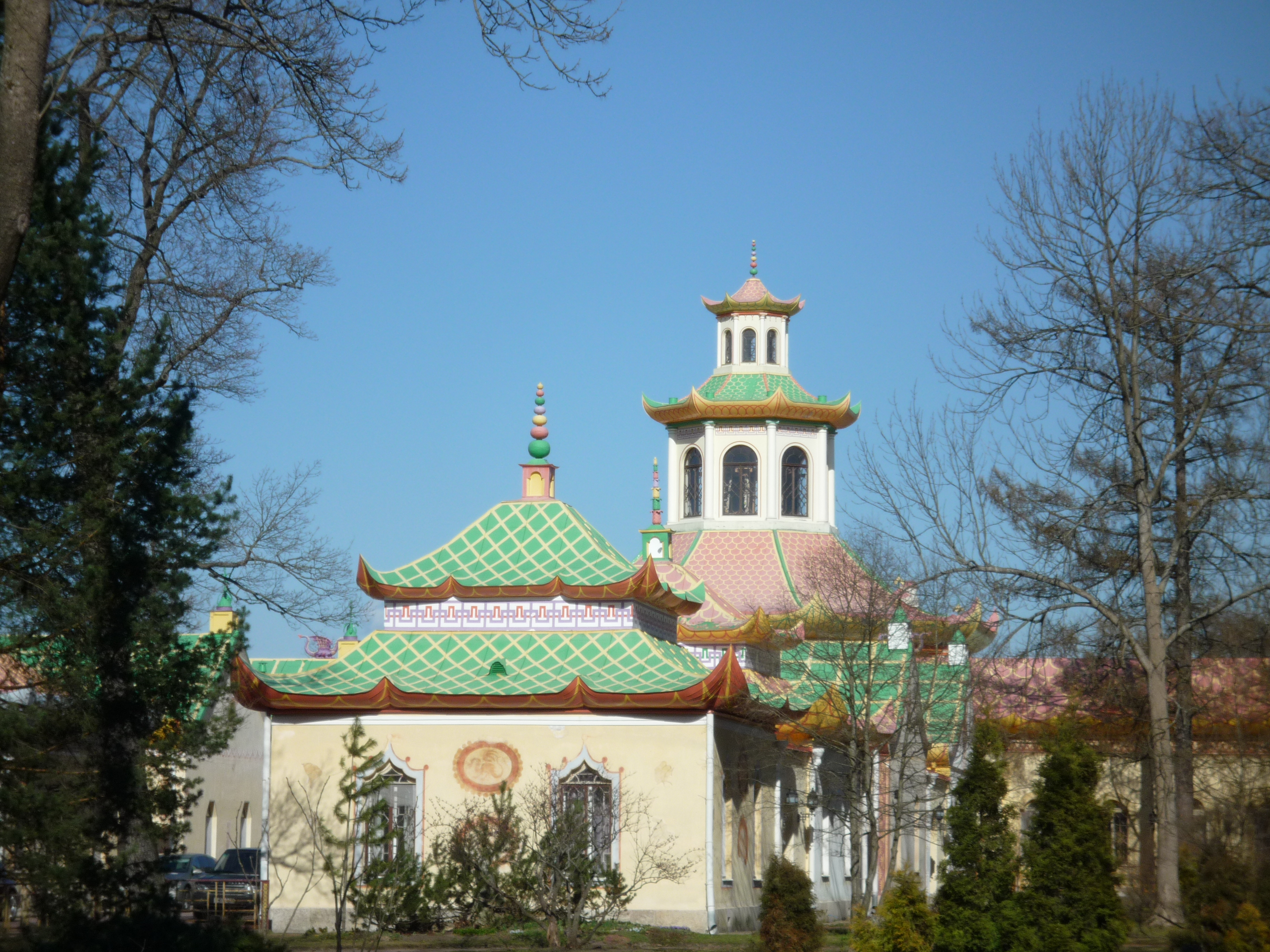
The Chinese Village

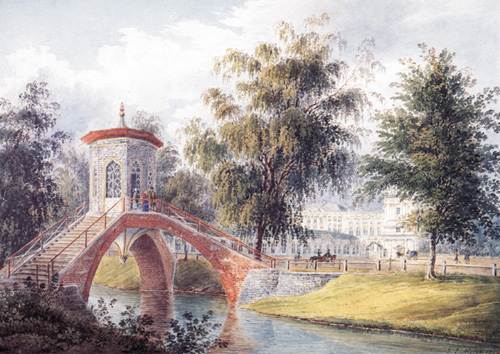
Cross (Krestovy) Bridge in the 19th century.

The Chinese Village in the Alexander Park of Tsarskoye Selo, Russia was Catherine the Great's attempt to follow the 18th-century fashion for the Chinoiserie.

== History ==
Probably inspired by a similar project in Drottningholm, Catherine ordered Antonio Rinaldi and Charles Cameron to model the village after a contemporary Chinese engraving from her personal collection. The village was to consist of 18 stylized Chinese houses (only ten were completed), dominated by an octagonal domed observatory (never completed at all). After Catherine failed in her ambition to procure a genuine Chinese architect, the Russian ambassador in London was instructed to obtain a replica of William Chambers's Great Pagoda in the Royal Botanic Gardens, Kew for Tsarskoye Selo, a central structure of the Chinoiserie architecture.

Catherine's death in 1796 led to the works being suspended. It was not until 1818 that tsar Alexander I of Russia asked the famous architect Vasily Stasov to overhaul the village in order to provide accommodation for his guests. Although much of the original orientalizing decor was lost as a result, the renovated village provided habitation for such eminent visitors as Nikolai Karamzin who worked on his History of the Russian State in one of the houses between 1822 and 1825.

The Chinese Opera Theatre was constructed not far from the village in 1779. It was there that an Italian composer Giovanni Paisiello would present his new operas to the Russian empress. The première of Leo Tolstoy's The Fruits of Enlightenment was also produced there. The theatre was burnt to the ground on 15 September 1941 and has never been rebuilt.

Three remarkable bridges lead to the village. The Dragon Bridge, so named after four zinc figures of winged dragons, and the Large Chinese Bridge, noted for pink granite vases and imitation coral branches, were completed in 1785. The Cross-Shaped Bridge had been constructed by the Neyelov Brothers six years earlier (illustrated, to the right).

The village was renovated under the direction of Ippolit Monighetti in 1859-61. The cottages sustained serious damage during the Nazi occupation but were restored in the 1990s to provide lodgings for VIP guests.

== See also ==
Media related to Chinese Village in Tsarskoe Selo at Wikimedia Commons

- Creaking Pagoda
- Chinoiserie
