= Alexander Palace =

Imperial residence south of St. Petersburg, Russia

- Александровский дворец
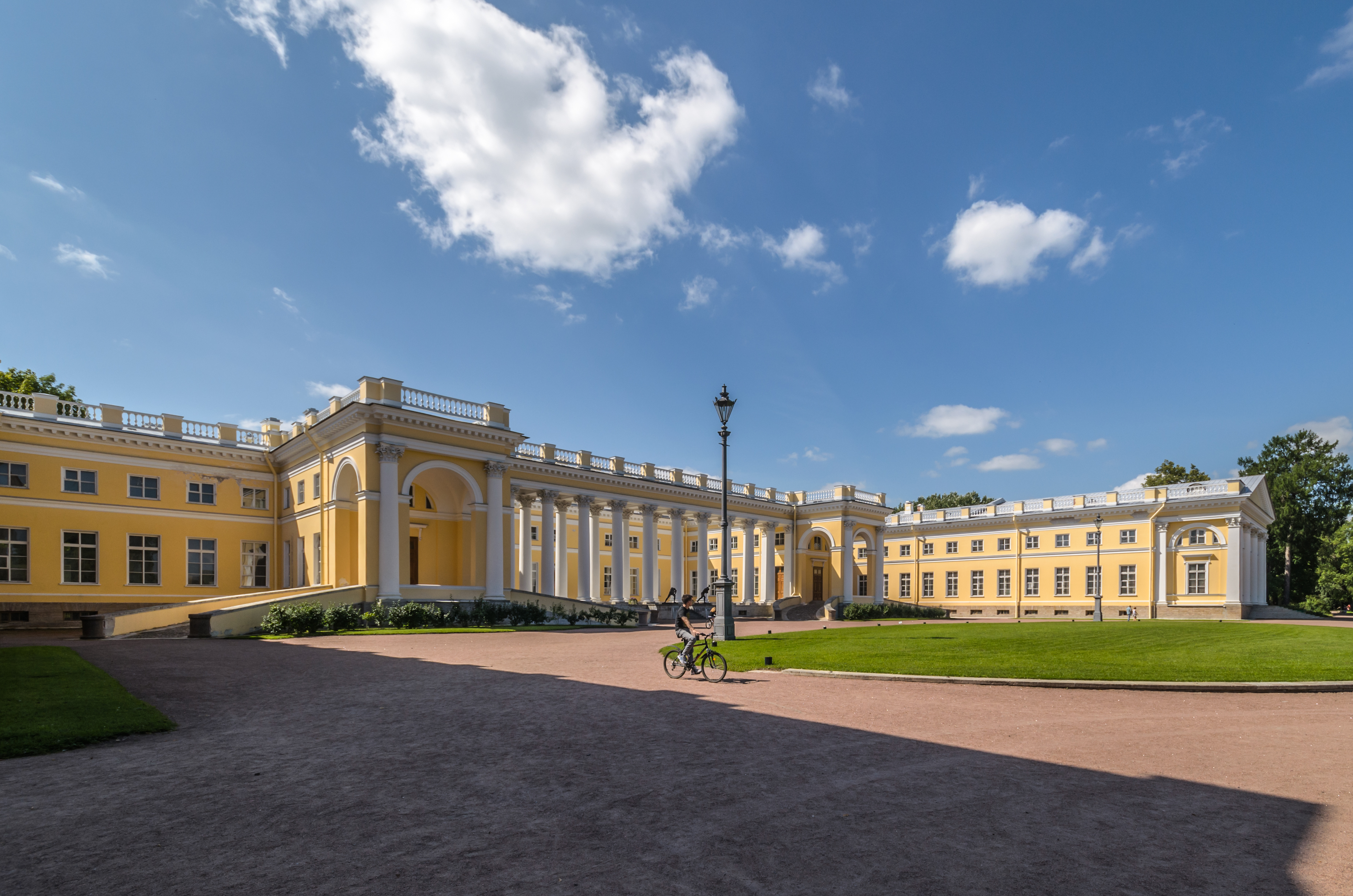
- Alexander Palace in Tsarskoye Selo
- Interactive map of the Alexander Palace area

General information
- Type: Imperial residence
- Location: Russia
- Coordinates: 59.721°N 30.3926°E
- Construction started: 1792

Design and construction
- Architect: Giacomo Quarenghi

The Alexander Palace (Russian: Александровский дворец, romanized: Alexandrovskiy dvorets, IPA: [ɐlʲɪkˈsandrəfskʲɪj dvɐˈrʲets]) is a former imperial residence near the town of Tsarskoye Selo in Russia, on a plateau about 30 miles (48 km) south of Saint Petersburg. The palace was commissioned by Catherine the Great in 1792.

Due to the privacy it offered when officially resident in St Petersburg, the Alexander Palace was the preferred residence of the last Russian Emperor, Nicholas II and his family; its safety and seclusion compared favourably to the Winter Palace during the years immediately prior to the Russian Revolution. It was the birthplace of Nicholas II's eldest child Olga, while the rest of his children were born in the Peterhof Palace. In 1917, the palace became the family's initial place of imprisonment after the first of two Russian Revolutions in February which overthrew the House of Romanov during World War I. The Alexander Palace is situated in Alexander Park, not far from Catherine Park and the larger, more elaborate Catherine Palace. After undergoing years of renovation, the Alexander Palace opened in Summer 2021 as a state museum housing relics of the former imperial dynasty.

== Construction during the reign of Catherine the Great (Catherine II) ==
Empress/Tsarina Catherine II (Catherine the Great) of Russia by artist Johann Baptist von Lampi the Elder

The Alexander Palace was constructed in the Imperial retreat, near the town of Tsarskoe Selo, 30 miles south of the imperial capital city of St. Petersburg. The palace was commissioned by Empress/Tsarina Catherine II (Catherine the Great) (1729–1796, reigned 1762–1796), built near the earlier Catherine Palace for her favourite grandson, Grand Duke Alexander Pavlovich, the future emperor (tsar) Alexander I of Russia (1777–1825, reigned 1801–1825), on the occasion of his 1793 marriage to Grand Duchess Elizaveta Alexeievna, born Princess Luise Marie Augusta of Baden.

The Neoclassical edifice was planned by Giacomo Quarenghi and built between 1792 and 1796. It was agreed that the architect had excelled himself in creating a masterpiece. In 1821, the architect's son wrote:

An elegant building which looks over the beautiful new garden ... in Tsarskoe Selo, was designed and built by my father at the request of Catherine II, as a summer residence for the young Grand Duke Alexander, our present sovereign. In keeping with the august status of the person for whom the Palace was conceived, the architect shaped it with greatest simplicity, combining both functionality with beauty. Its dignified façade, harmonic proportions, and moderate ornamentation ... are also manifested in its interiors ..., without compromising comfort in striving for magnificence and elegance.

== Home of Grand Duke Alexander Pavlovich and Grand Duchess Elizaveta Alexeievna ==
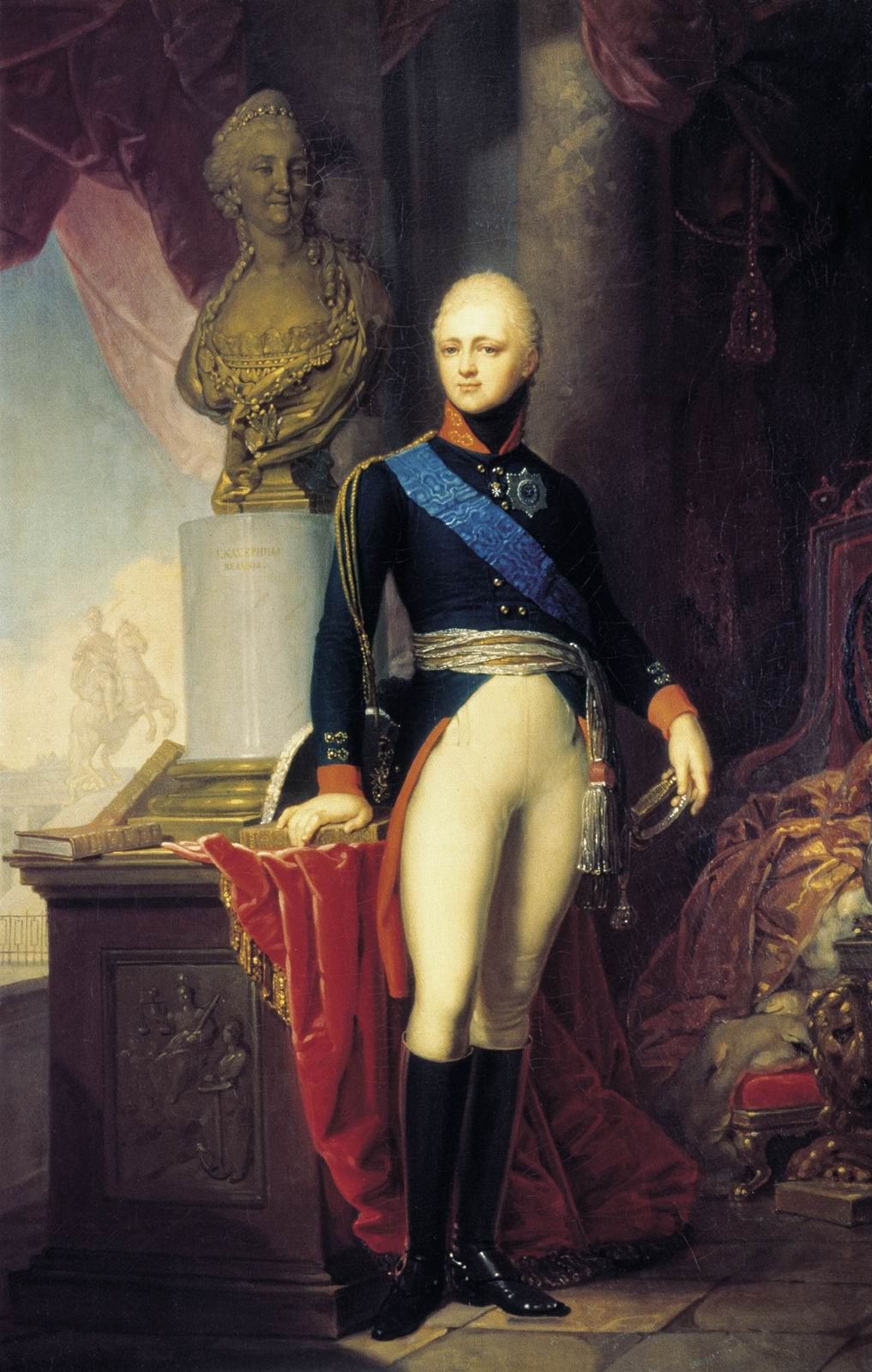
Grand Duke Alexander Pavlovich, by Vladimir Borovikovsky (1800)

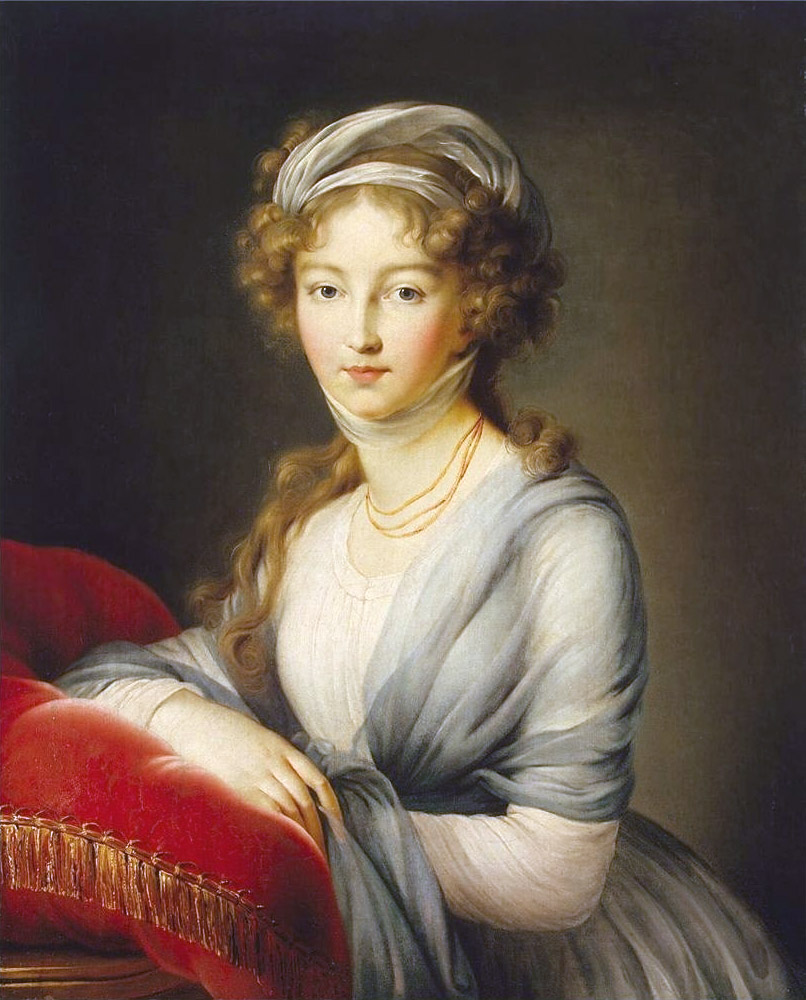
Grand Duchess Elizabeth Alexeievna by Vigée Le Brun (1795)

Alexander used the palace as a summer residence through the remainder of his grandmother's and his father, Paul's, reign. When he became emperor, however, he chose to reside in the much larger Catherine Palace nearby.

== Under Nicholas I ==
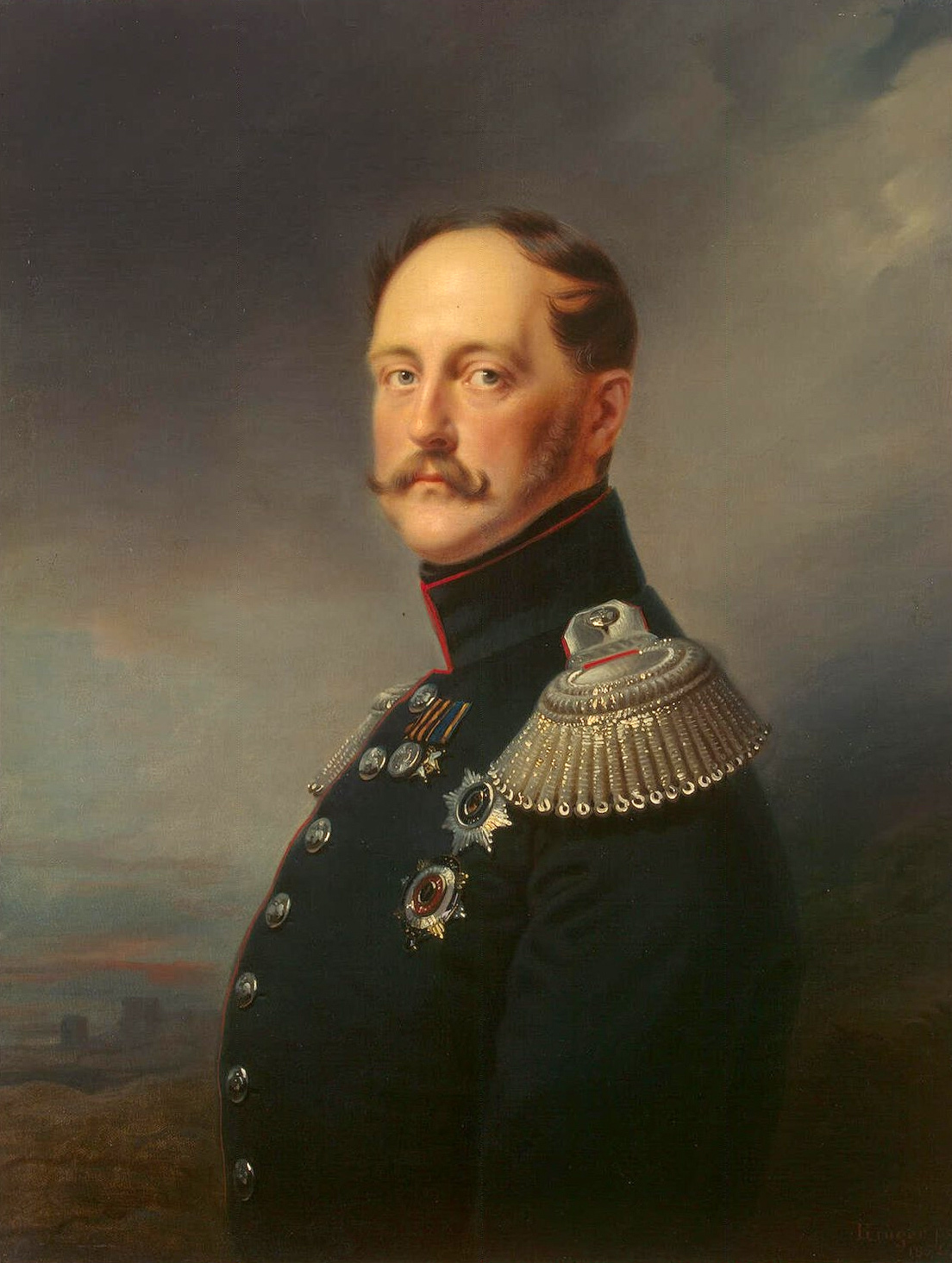
Emperor Nicholas I by Franz Krüger

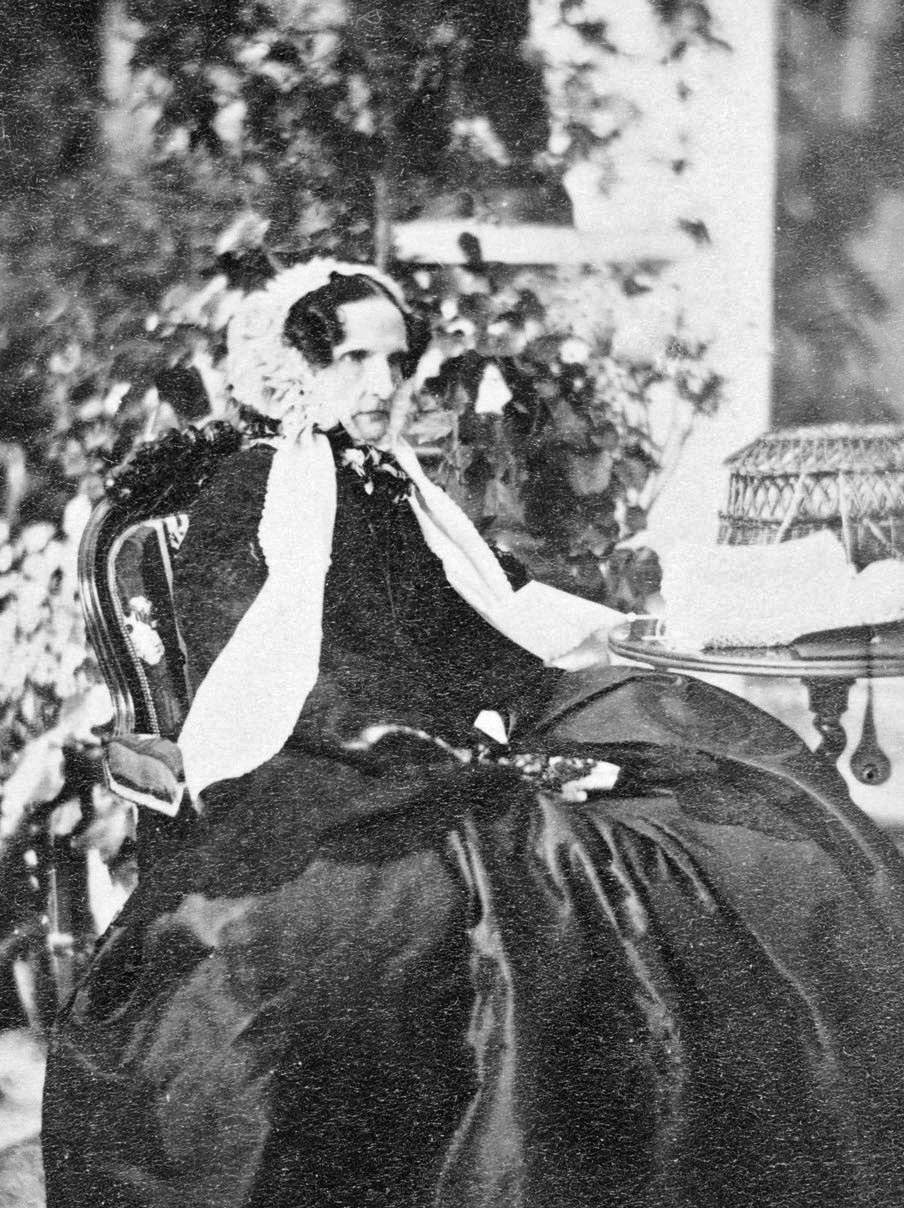
The Dowager Empress Alexandra Feodorovna in 1860, the year of her death

Alexander I gave the palace to his brother, the future Nicholas I, for summer usage. From that time on, it was the summer residence of the heir to the throne. From 1830 to 1850, extensive redecoration was carried out according to designs by D.Cerfolio, A.Thon, D.Yefimov, A.Stakenschneider and others in keeping with rapidly changing tastes. The appearance of the formal and private rooms of the palace during Nicholas' reign can be seen in exquisite watercolours by E. Hau, L. Premazzi and I. Volsky from 1840 to 1860. The famous Mountain Hall which had a large slide built-in for the children of Nicholas I was built during this time. Nicholas I and his family lived in the palace from the early spring till the end of May and after a short period at Krasnoye Selo during manoeuvres returned to the palace to spend their time there until the late autumn. In 1842, the Imperial couple celebrated their silver wedding anniversary with a series of galas including a medieval jousting tournament. Two years later, the family mourned the death of Nicholas's daughter Grand Duchess Alexandra (1825–1844), who was born at the palace and lived the last few months of her life there. On 19 October 1860, the Empress Alexandra Feodorovna also died at the palace.

== Under Alexander III and Maria Feodorovna ==
Alexander III and his Danish-born wife Maria Feodorovna had their apartments in the right-hand or western wing of the palace near the gardens. Before their accession to the imperial throne, Maria gave birth to their eldest child, the future Nicholas II, at Alexander Palace. In his diary, the then Tsarevich Alexander recorded the momentous event of the birth of his first child,

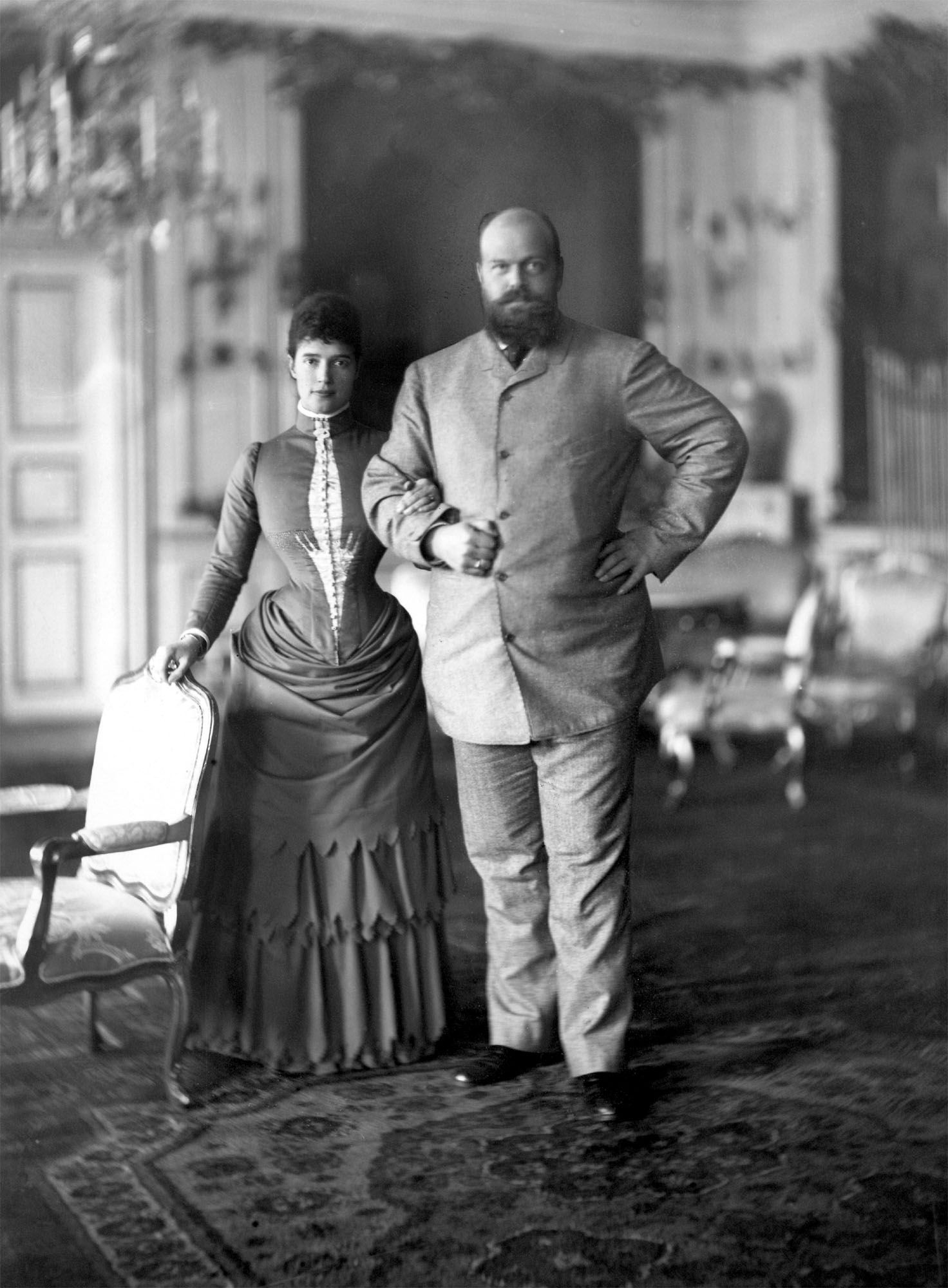
Emperor Alexander III and his wife Empress Maria Feodorovna on holiday in Copenhagen in 1893

Around 12.30 my wife came to the bedroom and lay down on a couch where everything was prepared. The pains became stronger and stronger, and Minny suffered very much. Papa ... helped me hold my darling the whole time. Finally, at 2.30, the last minute came and suddenly all her suffering stopped. God sent us a son whom we named Nicholas. What a joy it was! It is impossible to imagine. I sprang to embrace my darling wife, and she instantly became cheerful and was terribly happy. I had been weeping like a child but suddenly my heart became light and cheerful.

The entire imperial family was present at the birth of Alexander and Maria's first child. In a letter to her mother, Queen Louise, the Tsarevna wrote,

.. this bothered me immensely! The Emperor held me by one hand, my Sasha by the other, whilst every so often the Empress kissed me.

After Alexander III's death, Maria Feodorovna would stay at the palace in their rooms while visiting her son (Tsar Nicholas II) and daughter-in-law (Alexandra Feodorovna). As the estrangement with Alexandra Feodorovna became more apparent, the visits of the Dowager Empress became fewer.

== Under Nicholas II and Alexandra Feodorovna ==
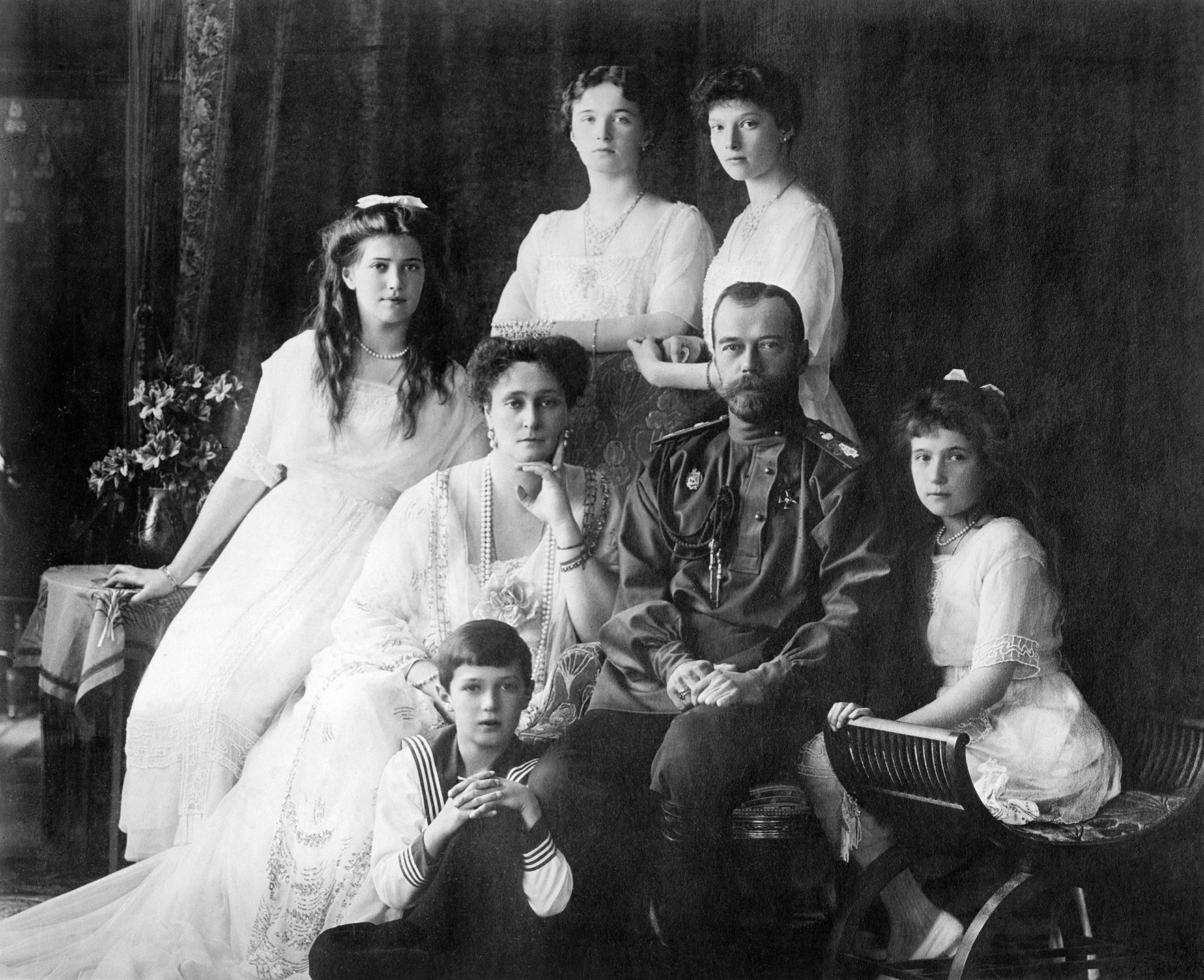
The Russian Imperial Family, 1913. Left to right: Grand Duchess Maria, Empress Alexandra, Grand Duchesses Olga and Tatiana, Emperor Nicholas II, and Grand Duchess Anastasia. Tsarevich Alexei sits in front of his parents.

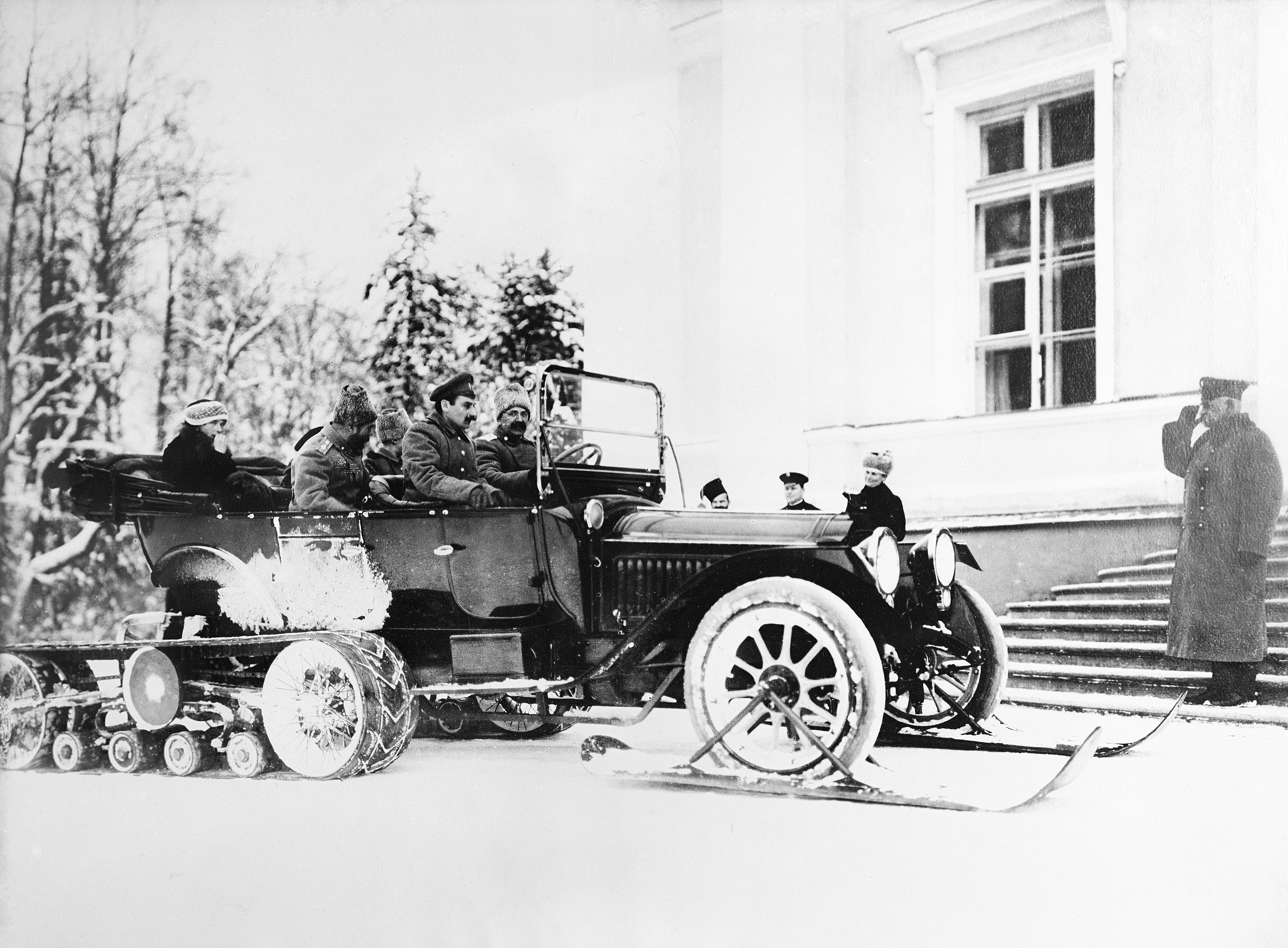
Members of the Imperial family in 1916 Packard Twin Six Model 1-35 Touring Sedan equipped with Kegresse track car at Alexander Palace, January 1917

The palace is most famous though for the role it played in the reign of the last tsar, Nicholas II. He and his wife Alexandra Feodorovna always loved the palace and decided to make it their permanent residence after the events of Bloody Sunday, which made the Winter Palace dangerous for them. They remodeled the former two-story ballroom into the Maple Room and the New Study and added rooms for their children on the floor above. To the horror of the court, Alexandra, and her architect Meltzer, chose a then-modern style of decoration, Jugendstil or Art Nouveau, considered by the aristocracy to be "middle class" and less than "Imperial". One of these most famous rooms is Alexandra's Mauve Room.

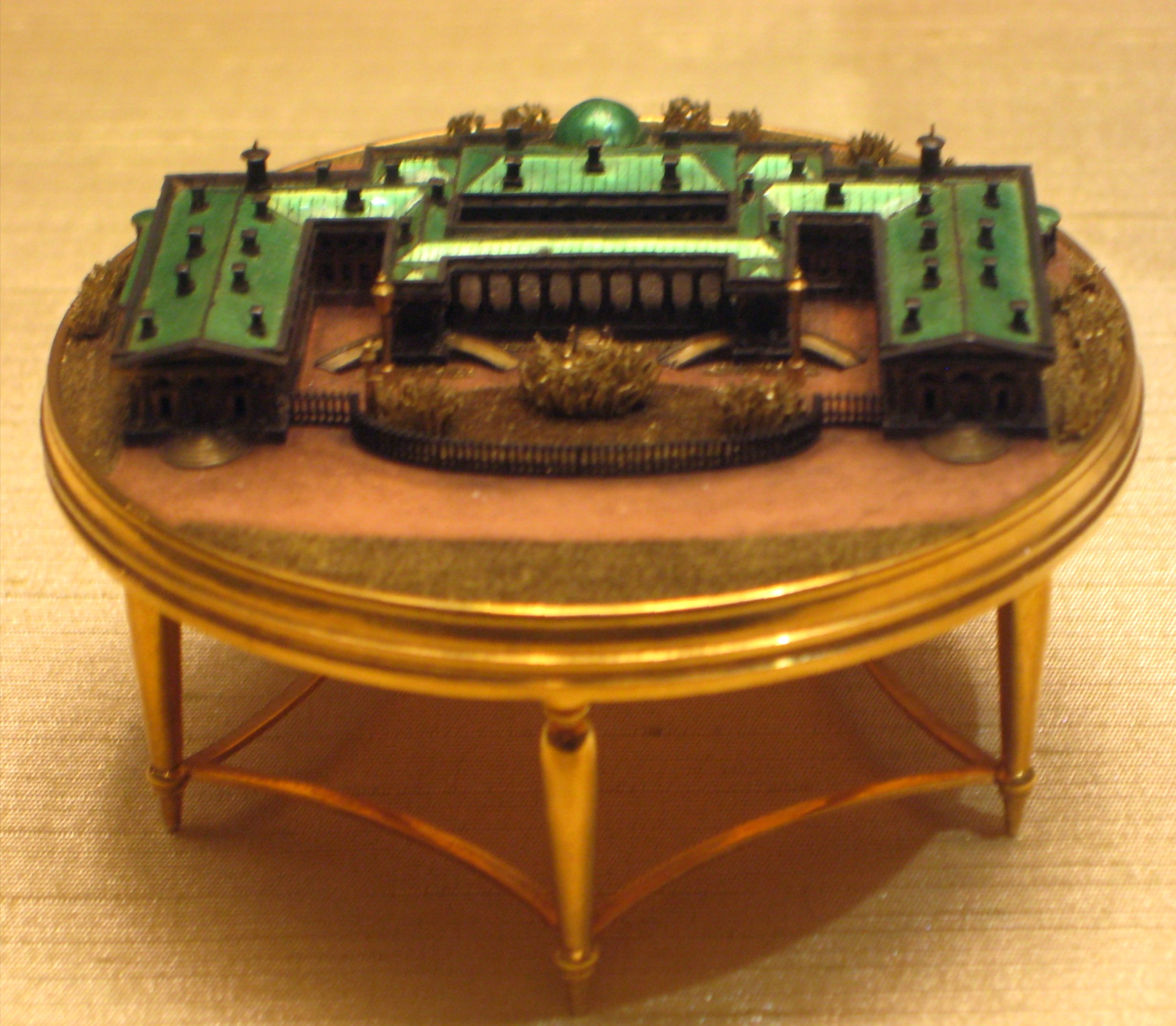
A tiny model of the palace, by Peter Carl Fabergé

During the reign of Nicholas II, the palace was wired for electricity and equipped with a telephone system. In 1899, a hydraulic lift was installed connecting the Empress' suite with the children's rooms on the second floor. Furthermore, with the advent of motion pictures, a screening booth was built in the Semicircular Hall to show films.

During the stormy years of war and revolution, the monumental walls of the Alexander Palace sheltered the Imperial Family from the outside world. Pierre Gilliard, tutor to Nicholas II's son, had free access to this inner sanctum. In his memoirs, the tutor later described that the family life at Tsarskoe Selo was less formal than at other residences. Apart from a few exceptions, the court did not reside at the palace. The Imperial Family would gather informally around the table at mealtimes without attendants, unless relatives were visiting.

== Romanovs under house arrest ==
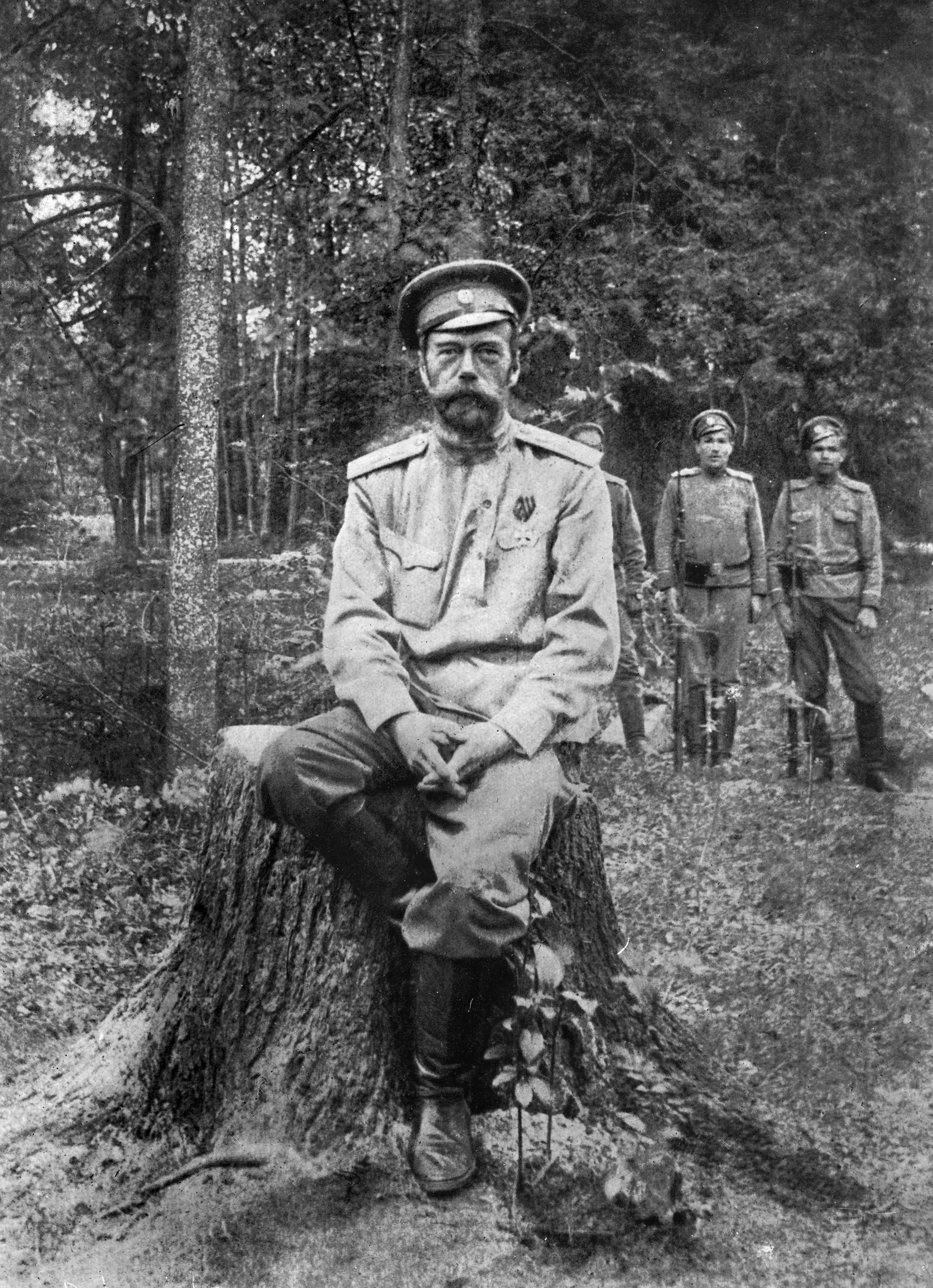
Nicholas II under guard at Tsarskoye Selo after his abdication in March 1917

Nicholas II abdicated the throne of Russia on 2 March 1917. Thirteen days later, he returned to Alexander Palace not as Emperor of Russia, but as Colonel Romanov. The Imperial Family were now held under house arrest and confined to a few rooms of the palace and watched over by a guard with fixed bayonets. The regime of their captivity, worked out by Alexander Kerensky himself, envisaged strict limitations in the life of the Imperial Family: isolation from the outer world, a guard during their promenades in the park, prohibition of any contacts and correspondence apart from approved letters. Gillard noted,

In their spare time, free from studies, the Empress and her daughters were engaged in sewing something, embroidering or weaving, but they were never idle.... During daytime walks all the members of the family, excluding the Empress, were engaged in physical work: they cleaned paths in the park from snow, chopped ice for the cellar, cut dry branches or old trees, storing firewood for the future winter. With the arrival of the warmer weather the entire family worked on an extensive kitchen-garden....

Due to an increasingly precarious situation in St. Petersburg, the leader of the provisional government, Alexander Kerensky, made the decision to move the Romanov family out of the palace into internal exile in Tobolsk in faraway Siberia. There had been calls for the prisoners to be housed in the prison at the notorious Fortress of St. Peter and St. Paul in St. Petersburg. To avoid this on the morning of 1 August 1917, a train took the family away. They were never to return.

== After the Romanovs ==
Not long after the departure of the Romanovs for Siberia, a museum was established within the Alexander Palace. It operated until the beginning of the Second World War. At the beginning of the war, the most valuable furnishings were evacuated to the interior of the country. The remaining parts of the collection were hidden in the basement.

== German occupation during the Second World War ==
During the Nazi German occupation, the palace was used as headquarters for the German military command. The area in front of the palace was turned into a cemetery for SS soldiers. Artistically and historically unique collections were partially destroyed. As the German forces were leaving the Soviet Union, many of the former imperial palaces were set ablaze. The Alexander Palace was spared.

== After the war ==
After the expulsion of the German forces, the palace was used as a depot for artworks coming back into the area. The neighbouring Catherine Palace had been looted and mostly destroyed. For a time it was planned to restore the interiors of the Alexander Palace, but this decision was reversed. As interest in Nicholas II and his family was discouraged by the Soviet regime, so too was interest in the palace that had been their residence. The new plan was to create a museum to Pushkin. With the exception of the heavily damaged Reception and New Study, the private rooms of the imperial family were altered to plain exhibition halls. The museum plan was then shelved, and the palace was handed over to the Soviet Navy. Many of the palace's former collections still existed, but were relocated to other museums such as the Pavlovsk Palace. Alexander Palace was seen as little more than an enhancement to the beautiful Alexander Park.

== Recent history ==
When it appeared that the Soviet Navy intended to vacate the complex, the Alexander Palace was included in the 1996 World Monuments Watch by the World Monuments Fund (WMF). With funding from American Express in the same year, WMF helped with emergency renovations to the roof over the Nicholas II left wing of the palace, comprising approximately one-third of the building's total roof structure.

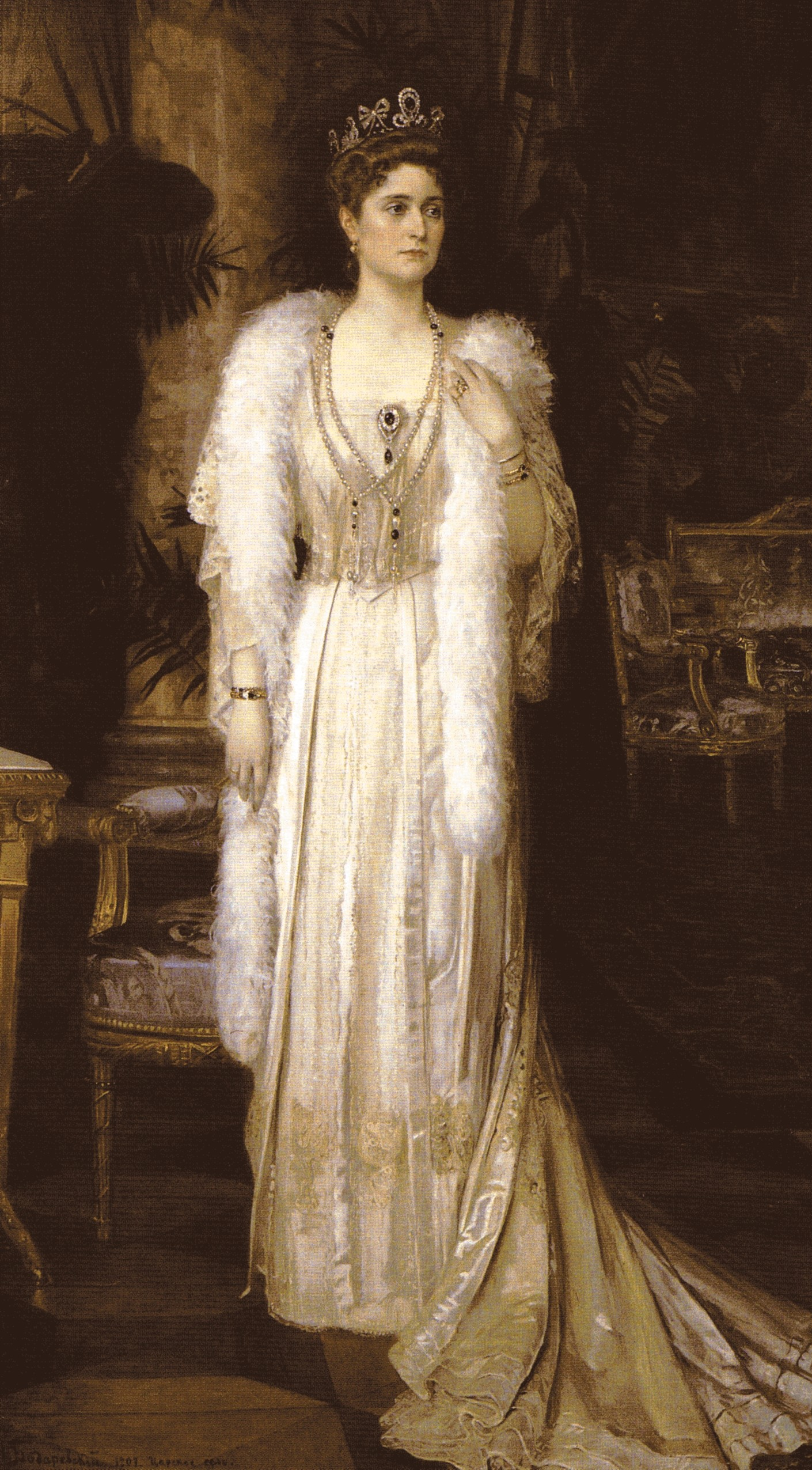
Portrait of Empress Alexandra Feodorovna, 1907, by Nikolai Bodarevsky

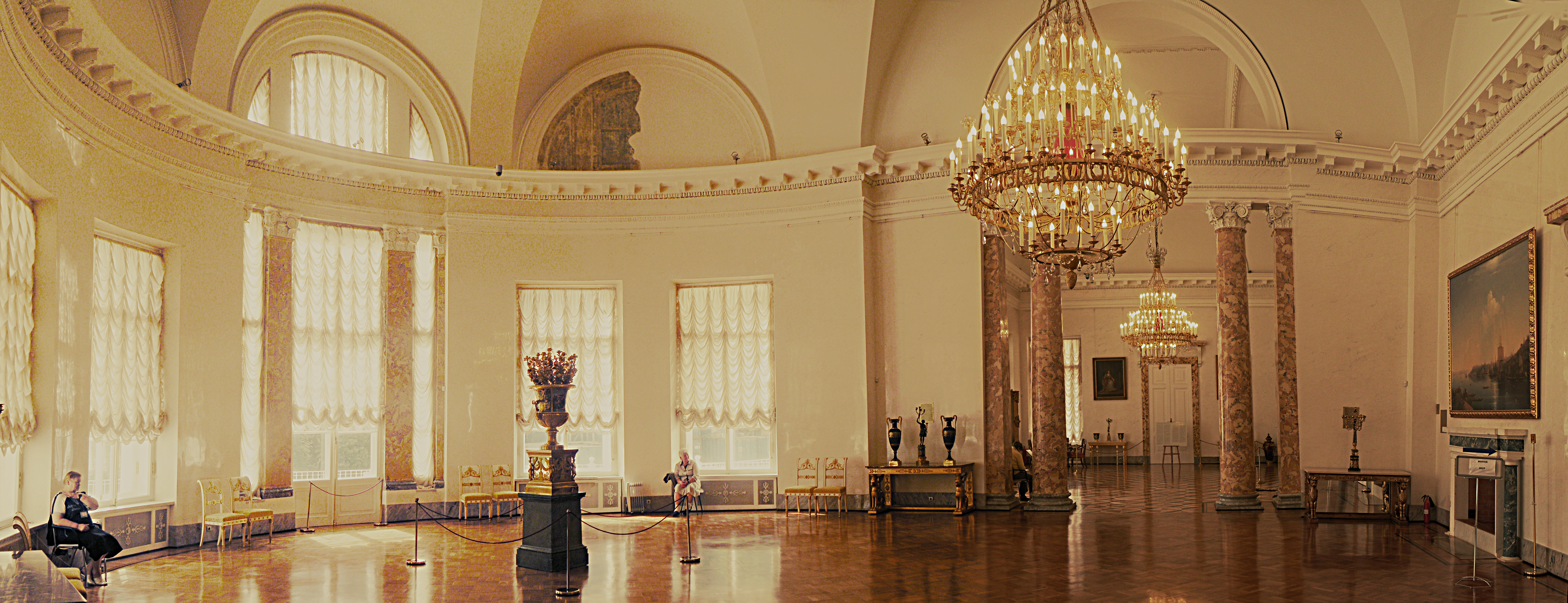
The Semi-Circular Hall, after the 2010 restoration

In the summer of 1997, a permanent exhibition was opened dedicated to the imperial family. Certain elements of the Reception Room, Nicholas II's New Study and Alexandra Feodorovna's Drawing Room were recreated to provide a backdrop for exhibitions of historical costumes, weapons and objects of applied art. A portrait of Alexandra Feodorovna by Friedrich von Kaulbach was returned to its original position. Clothing worn by the last imperial family and uniforms related to the court of Tsar Nicholas II were also placed on display. Much of this clothing only survived because it had been used as packing case wadding for more precious objects when the palace was evacuated in World War II.

In 2010 the three largest public rooms in the middle wing were reopened, following partial restoration: the Semi-Circular Hall, the Portrait Hall and the Marble Drawing Room. However, despite the best efforts of curators, limited restoration funds, dispersed collections, and the absence of the palms and flowers – from now-vanished imperial hothouses – that had once lushly decorated several of the rooms, meant that the presentations were somewhat sparse and of varying quality.

In 2014 the Russian government finally allocated significant funds to enable a more complete and authentic restoration of the quarters of the imperial family. This will include the Art Nouveau Maple Room and the celebrated Mauve Room of Alexandra. In September 2015 the palace closed to the public for this major multi-year project.

In August 2021, the east wing of the palace was reopened to visitors following the completion of restorations to the private apartments of Nicholas II and Alexandra Feodorovna. The rooms recreated are: the New Study, the Moorish Bathroom, the Working Study, Nicholas' Reception Room, the Valet's Room, the Maple Drawing Room, the Pallisander Drawing Room, the Mauve Boudoir, Alexandra's Reception Room, the Imperial Bedroom, the Small and Large Libraries, and the Mountain Hall. The first floor of this wing, once containing the rooms of Nicholas II's children, is now home to an exhibition of items belonging to the children of various emperors.

Plans are currently underway for the renovation of the west wing; largely guest apartments at the time of Nicholas II. These are expected to be finished no earlier than 2024.

== See also ==
- Chinese Village – a piece of Chinoiserie in the Alexander Palace Park
- Catherine Palace – another palace in Tsarskoe Selo
- Gatchina Palace – summer residence of Nicholas II's parents
- Pavlovsk – palace of Paul I and his wife Maria Feodorovna
- Peterhof – summer residence of Nicholas II
- Emperor railway station in Pushkin town

== Sources ==
- Shvidkovskiĭ, Dmitriĭ Olegovich (2007). Russian Architecture and the West. Yale University Press. ISBN 978-0300109122.
