= Alexander Park (Tsarskoye Selo) =

Coordinates: 59°43′18″N 30°22′38″E

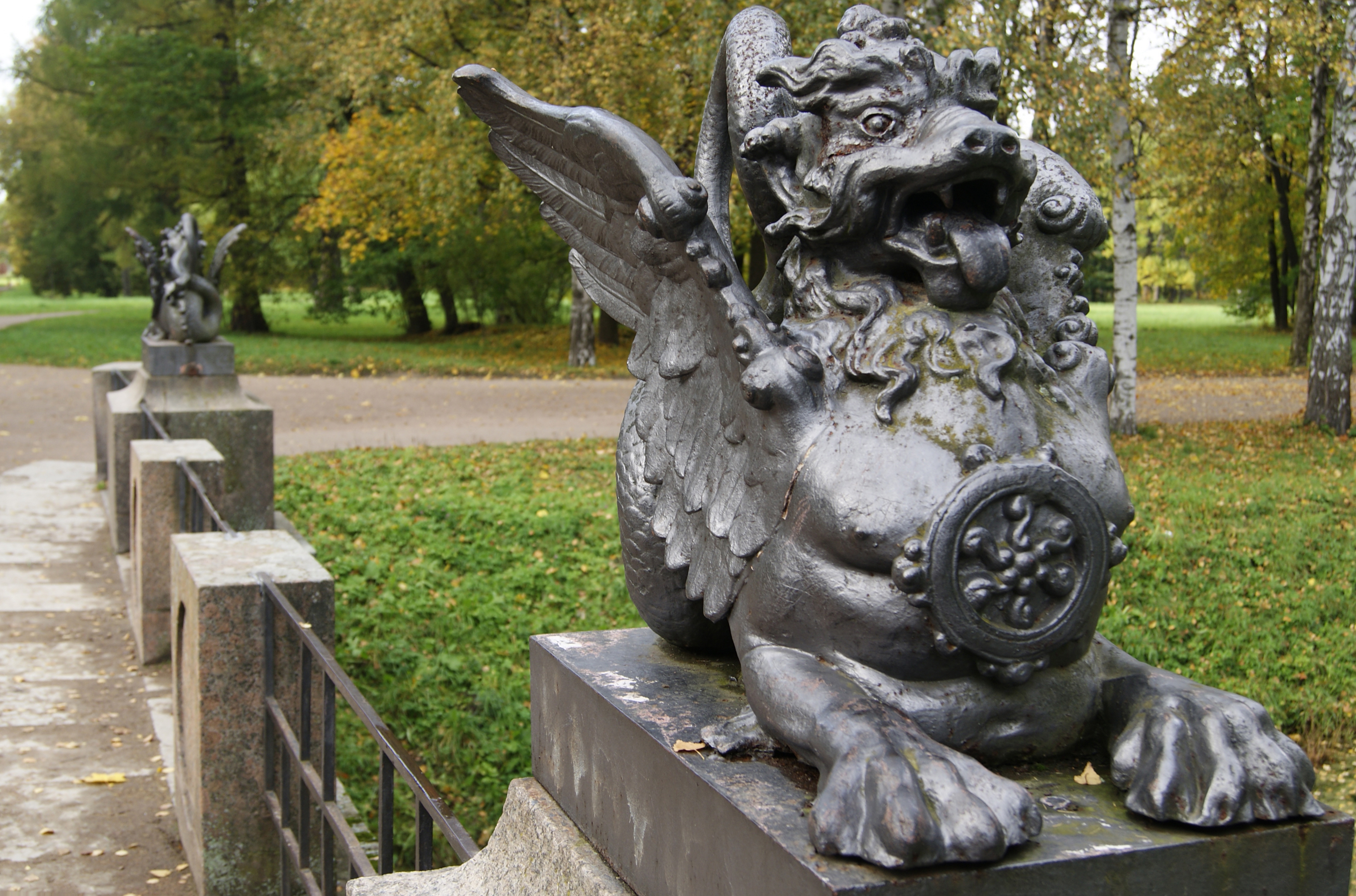
The Dragon Bridge

Alexander Park (Russian: Александровский парк) is a park in Tsarskoye Selo (Russian: Ца́рское Село́), outside Saint Petersburg. It is located to the west of the Catherine Palace, and it comprises almost 200 hectares. It is divided into four smaller squares, each one with a complex geometrical lay-out. The Alexander Palace (built in 1792-1796 for the future Emperor Alexander I of Russia) is situated in the Alexander Park.

== History ==
Alexander Park was developed in the 1740s. During the reign of Empress Elizabeth but during the reign (1741-1762) of Elizabeth, the garden before the palace became almost completely overgrown.
