= Kremlin Armoury =

Museum and cultural heritage site in Moscow, Russia

- Оружейная палата
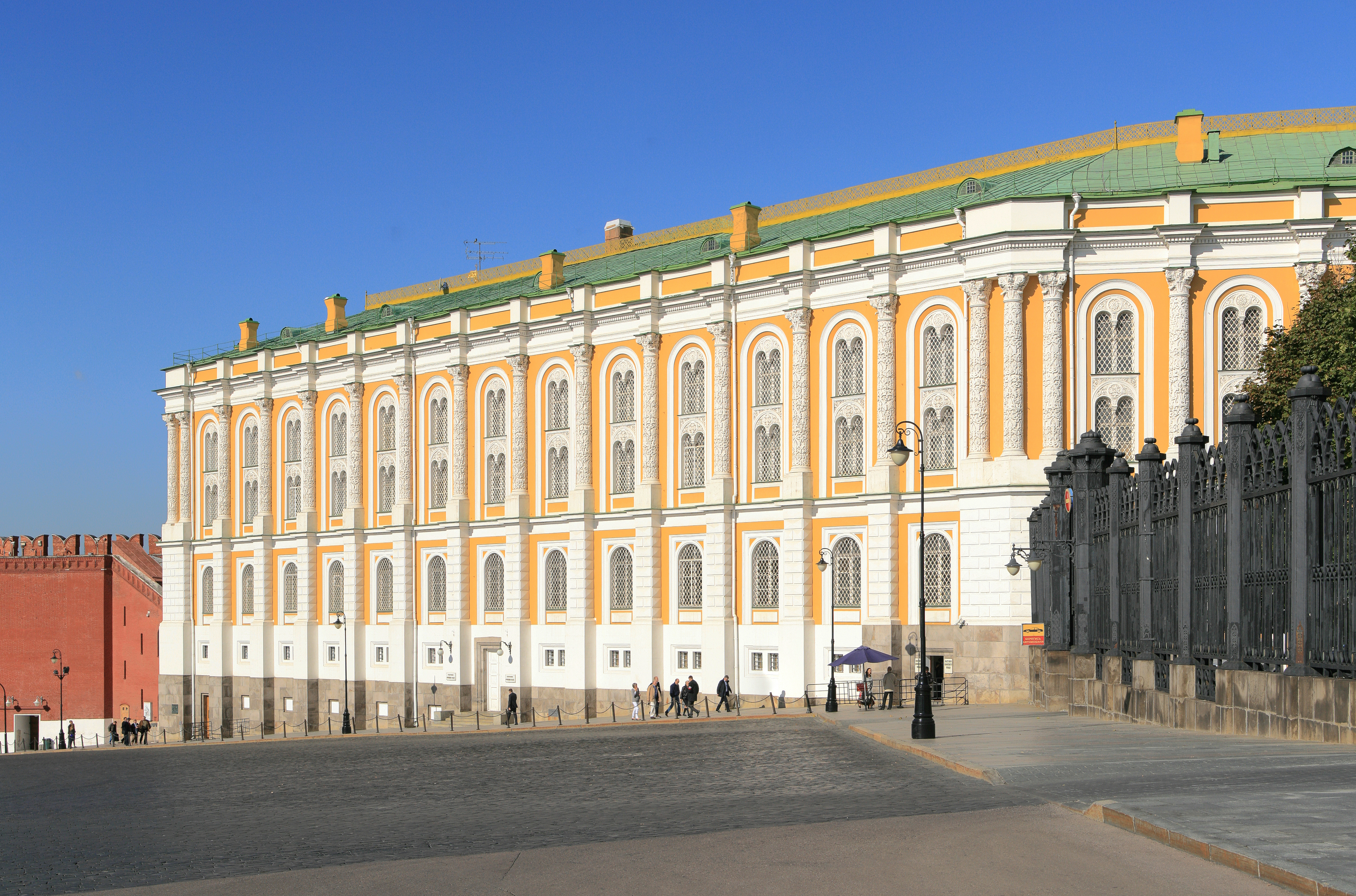
- Moscow Armoury

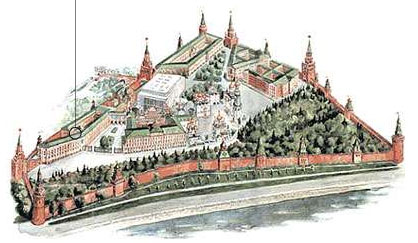
- Location in the Moscow Kremlin

General information
- Coordinates: 55°44′58.25″N 37°36′47.90″E
- Construction started: 1508
- Owner: Government of Russia

The Kremlin Armoury (Note: Officially called the "Armoury Chamber" but also known as the cannon yard, the "Armoury Palace", the "Moscow Armoury", the "Armoury Museum", and the "Moscow Armoury Museum" but different from the Kremlin Arsenal.) (Russian: Оружейная палата) is one of the oldest museums in Moscow. It is located in the Moscow Kremlin, and is a part of the Moscow Kremlin Museum.

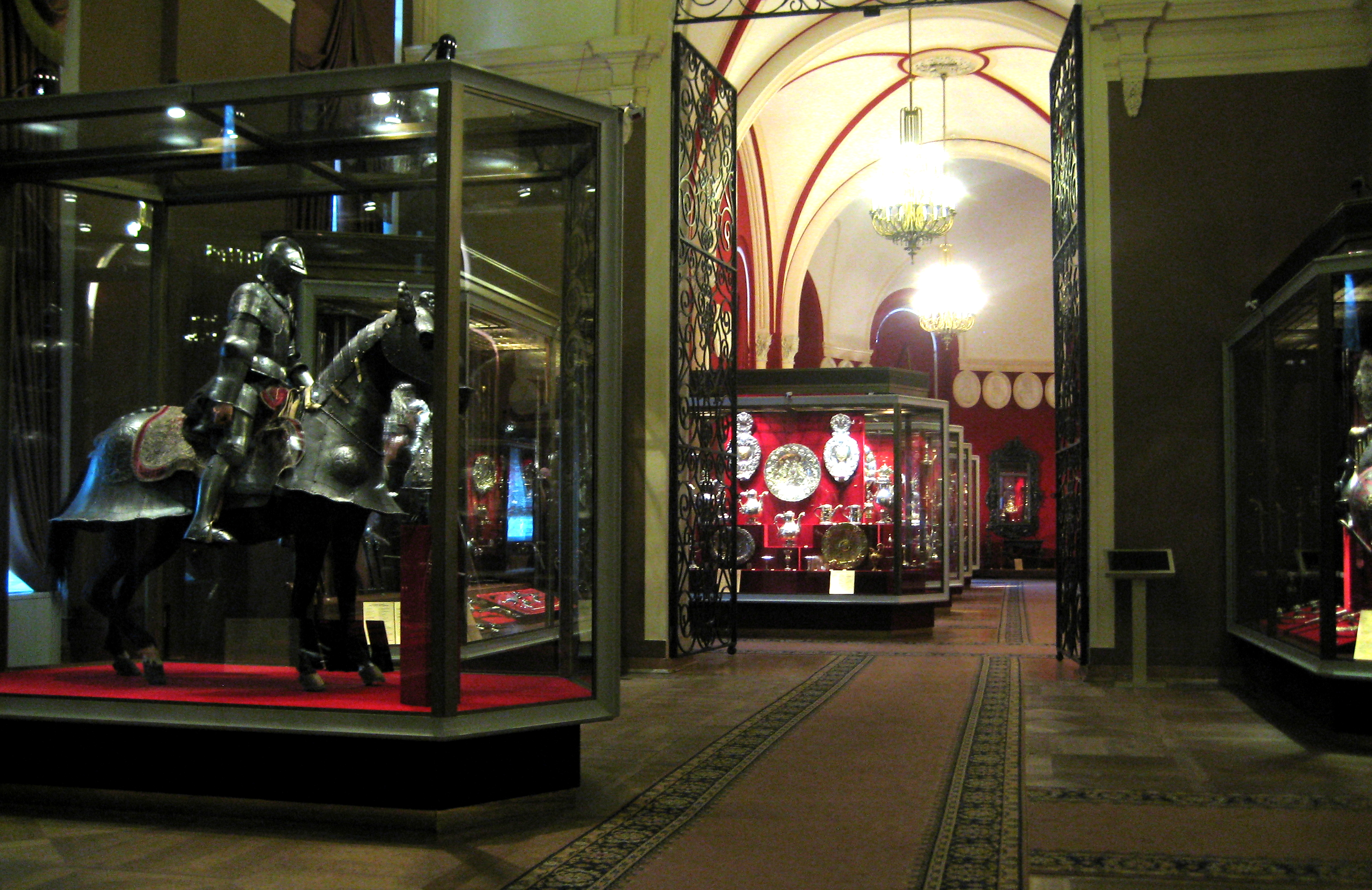
Kremlin Armoury interior

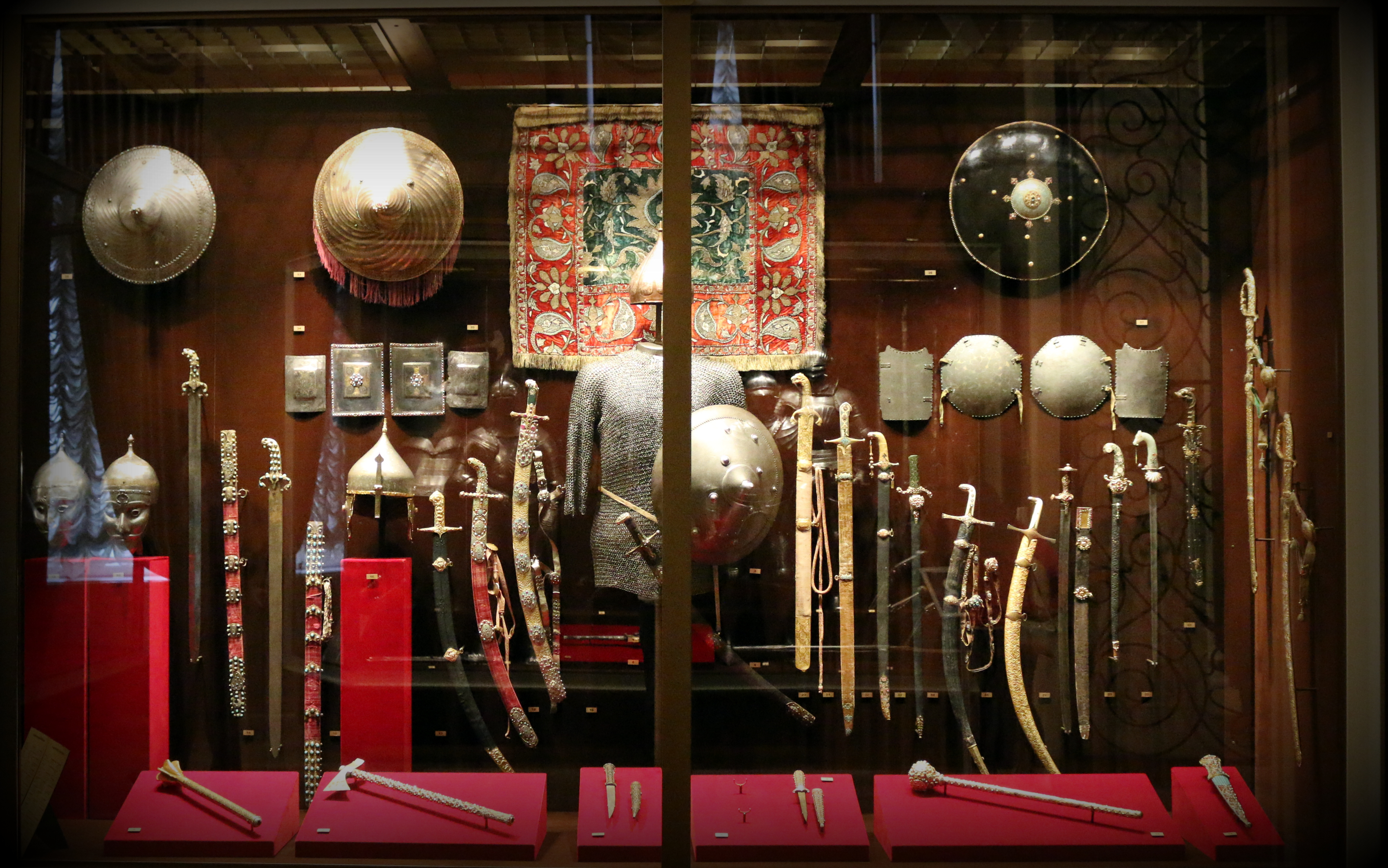
Persian Arms and Armours at the Kremlin Armoury Museum

The Kremlin Armoury originated as the royal arsenal in 1508. Until the transfer of the court to St Petersburg, the Armoury was in charge of producing, purchasing and storing weapons, jewelry and various household articles of the tsars. The finest Muscovite gunsmiths (the Vyatkin brothers), jewelers (Gavrila Ovdokimov), and painters (Simon Ushakov) used to work there. In 1640 and 1683, they opened the iconography and pictorial studios, where the lessons on painting and handicrafts could be given. In 1700, the Armoury was enriched with the treasures of the Golden and Silver chambers of the Russian tsars.

== History ==
In 1711, Peter the Great had the majority of masters transferred to his new capital, St Petersburg. 15 years later, the Armoury was merged with the Fiscal Yard (the oldest depository of the royal treasures), Stables Treasury (in charge of storing harnesses and carriages) and the Master Chamber (in charge of sewing clothes and bedclothes for the tsars). After that, the Armoury was renamed into the Arms and Master Chamber. Alexander I of Russia nominated the Armoury as the first public museum in Moscow in 1806, but the collections were not opened to the public until seven years later.

Ten of the 44 surviving Fabergé imperial Easter eggs are displayed at the Armory Museum. After the Russian Revolution, the imperial family's palaces were ransacked and their treasures moved to the Kremlin Armoury on order of Vladimir Lenin.

== Russian Diamond Fund ==
Beside the Armoury Chamber/Museum, the Kremlin Armoury is also currently home to the Russian Diamond Fund.
