= Fabergé (disambiguation) =

The House of Fabergé was a Russian jewellery firm founded in 1842 by Gustav Fabergé

Fabergé may also refer to:

== Companies ==
- Fabergé UK Limited refers to the luxury jewellery company since 2007, and holder of all Fabergé trademarks
- Fabergé & Cie, a Parisian jewellery firm founded in 1924 by two sons of Peter Carl Fabergé, and operating in France until 2001
- Fabergé Inc., an American personal care products company founded by Samuel Rubin that was unrelated to the Fabergé family but began trading with their name in 1937

== Other ==
- Fabergé (cosmetics), a brand name used by Fabergé Parfums and Fabergé Inc.
- Fabergé eggs, jewelled eggs created by the House of Fabergé
- Fabergé workmaster, a craftsman who produced objects for the House of Fabergé

== People ==
- Gustav Fabergé (1814–1893), a jeweller who founded the House of Fabergé
- Peter Carl Fabergé (1846–1920), elder son of Gustav
- Agathon Fabergé (1862–1895), younger son of Gustav
- Agathon Carl Theodor Fabergé (1876–1951), second son of Peter Carl
- Alexander Julius Fabergé (1877–1952), third son of Peter Carl
- Theo Fabergé (1922–2007), grandson of Peter Carl
- Tatiana Fabergé (1930–2020), granddaughter of Peter Carl and member of the Fabergé UK Limited Heritage Council
- Sarah Fabergé (born 1958), jeweller and daughter of Theo and member of the Fabergé UK Limited Heritage Council
