= Fabergé UK Limited =

Luxury jewellery brand

Fabergé UK Limited (jeweller)
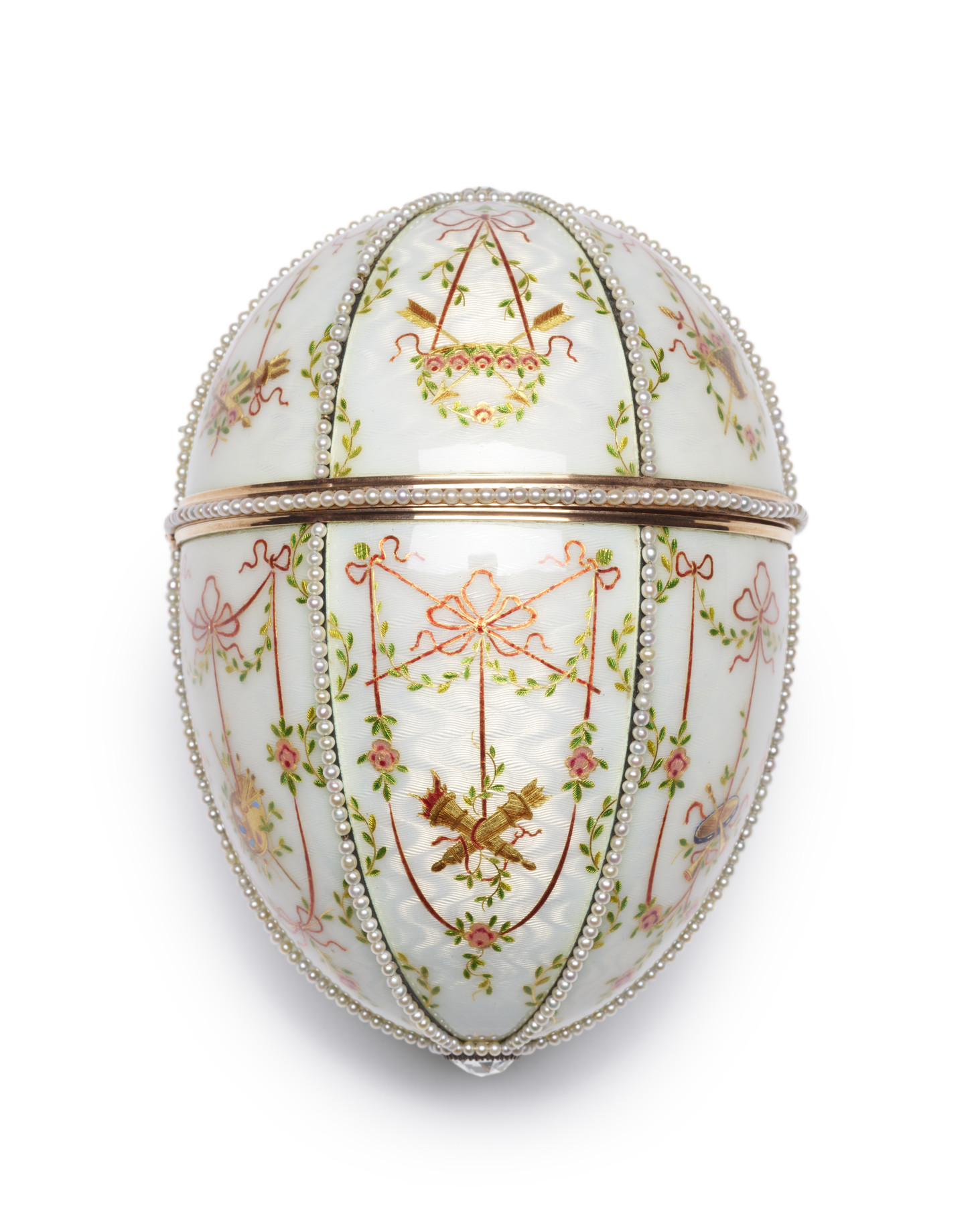
- Gatchina Palace Fabergé Egg, 1901.
- Type: Private
- Industry: Luxury goods
- Founded: 2007; 19 years ago
- Founder: Gustav Fabergé (1842), Peter Carl Fabergé, Tatiana Fabergé, Sarah Fabergé
- Headquarters: London, United Kingdom
- Area served: Worldwide
- Key people: Sergei Mosunov (Owner and CEO)
- Parent: SMG Capital
- Website: faberge.com

Fabergé (French: Fabergé; Russian: Фаберже, Faberzhe) is a luxury jewellery house based in London.

First known for its Imperial Fabergé eggs, they became notable for the decorative objects and jewellery created for the Russian Imperial Court, and for other royal families, aristocracy and collectors.

Today, Fabergé UK Limited is headquartered on Buckingham Palace Road, London and creates fine jewellery with precious and semi-precious stones, time pieces and Fabergé eggs.

The company has existed in some form since 1842.

== Early History ==
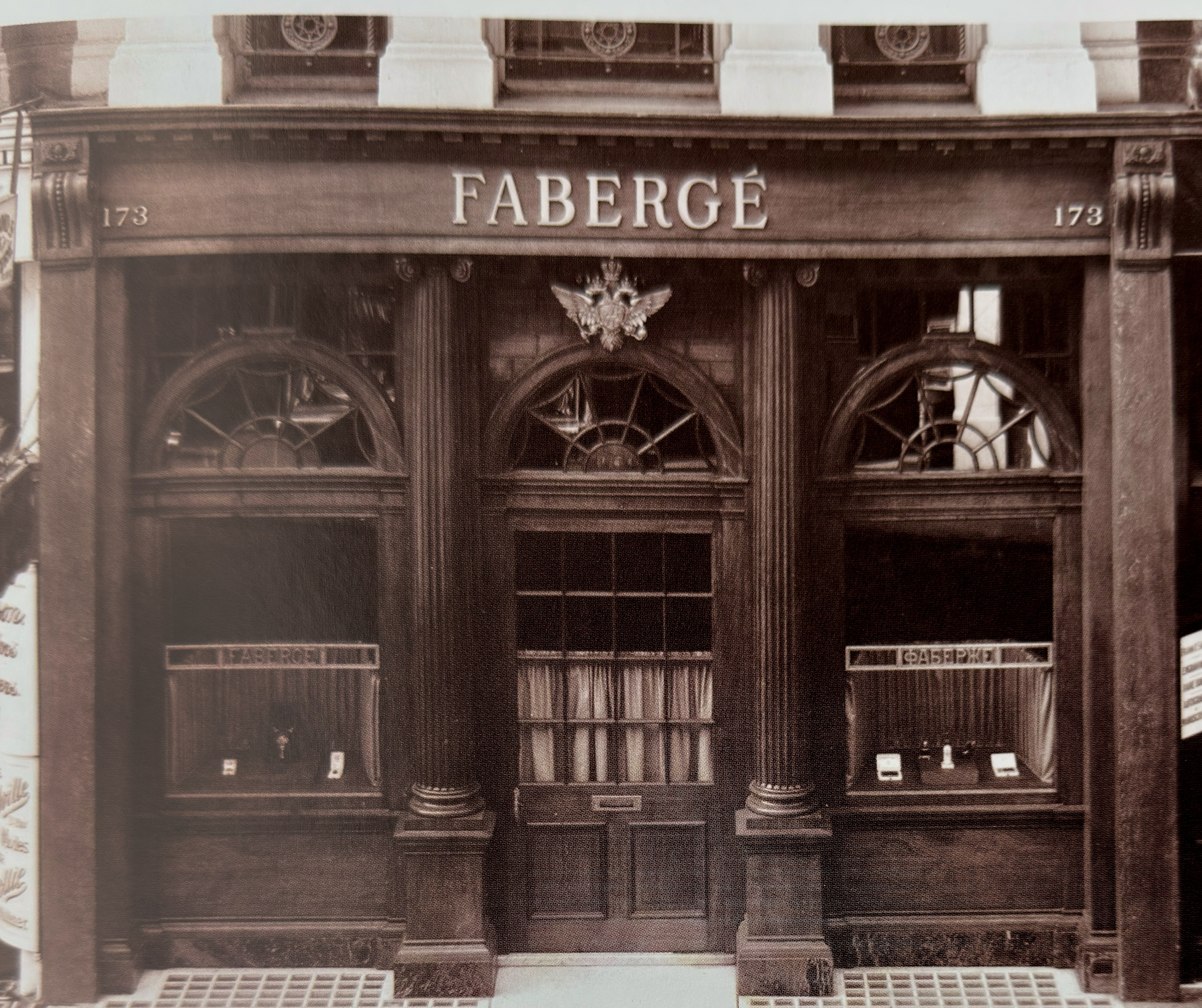
The first Faberge boutique outside Russia, at 173 Bond Street London, 1907.

The House of Fabergé was founded in Saint Petersburg in 1842 by goldsmith Gustav Fabergé and later expanded under his son Peter Carl Fabergé, who assumed control of the firm in 1872. Under Carl, Fabergé became one of the leading jewellery houses of Imperial Russia, producing jewellery, decorative objects and the Imperial Easter Eggs commissioned by Tsars Alexander III and Nicholas II after being appointed Goldsmith by special appointment to the Imperial Crown and establishing a relationship with the Russian royal family that would define the firm's international reputation.

By the early twentieth century, the firm employed about 500 artisans and designers. In 1903 it opened a London branch, its only permanent branch outside the Russian Empire, serving British royalty and an international clientele. The branch closed in 1917 following the disruption of trade during the First World War and the Russian Revolution.

After the Revolution, Carl Fabergé's sons Alexander and Eugène established Fabergé & Cie in Paris, which continued until 2001. Separately, in 1937, American businessman Samuel Rubin registered Fabergé Inc., using the Fabergé name for perfume without the family's permission. Following a legal settlement with the family, Rubin retained the right to use the name for $25,000.

Fabergé Inc. subsequently passed through several owners and was acquired by Unilever in 1989. Unilever expanded registration of the Fabergé trademark and licensed the name for jewellery, watches, decorative eggs and other products, including work produced by German jeweller Victor Mayer.

In the early 2000s, Fabergé egg collector Viktor Vekselberg and business partner Brian Gilbertson had hoped to buy the Fabergé brand name from Unilever but their attempts failed. In 2004, Vekselberg had purchased more Fabergé objects from the Forbes family leaving him with the most extensive Fabergé jewellery collection.

In 2007, Pallinghurst Resources acquired Unilever's Fabergé trademarks, licences and associated rights for US$38 million and formed Fabergé UK Limited, beginning the modern history of the company.

== Fabergé UK establishment and Fabergé Heritage Council ==
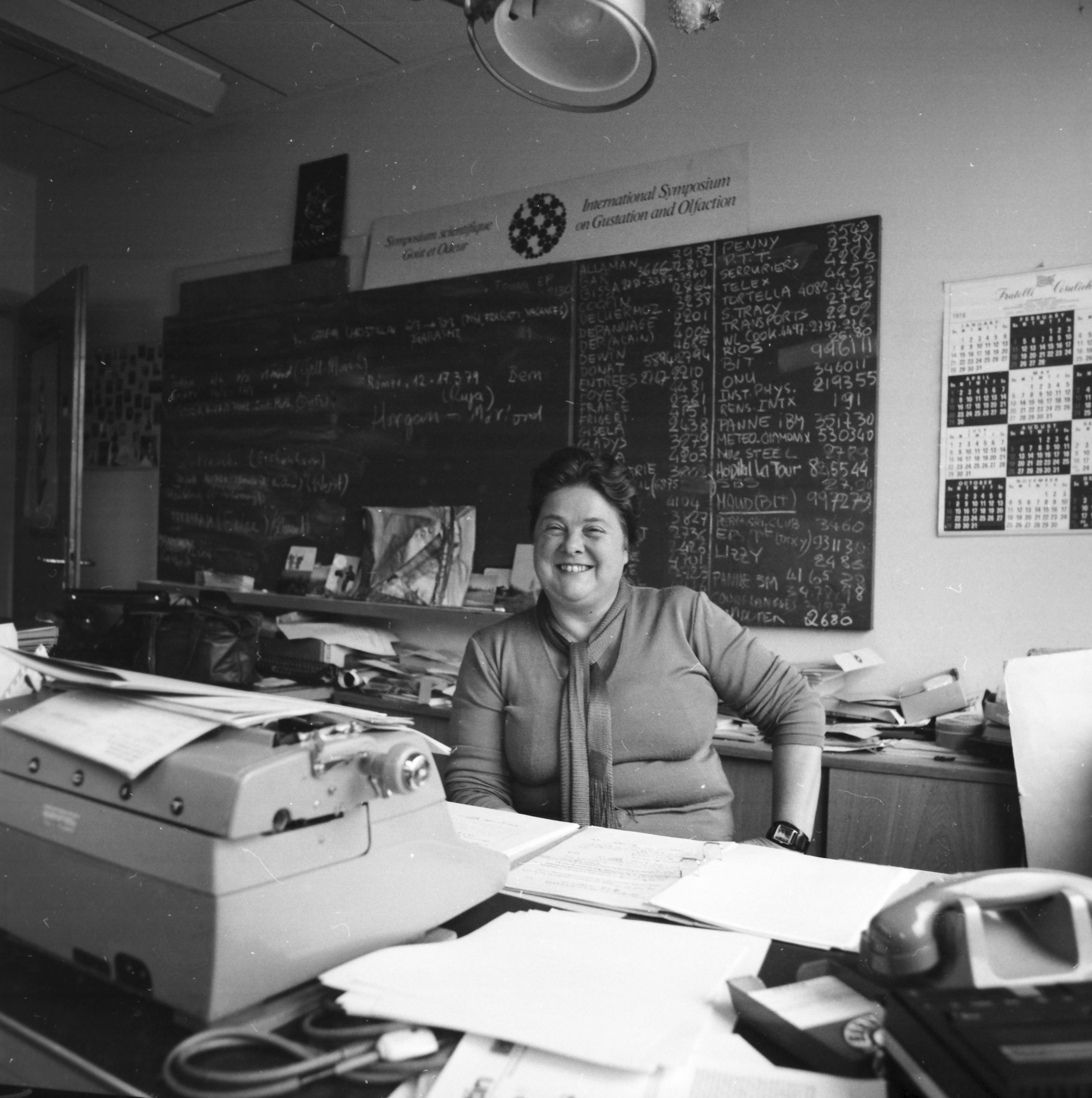
Tatiana (Tania) Fabergé was the head secretary of the CERN Theoretical Physics department from 1957 until her retirement in 1995, and member of the Fabergé Heritage Council from 2014.

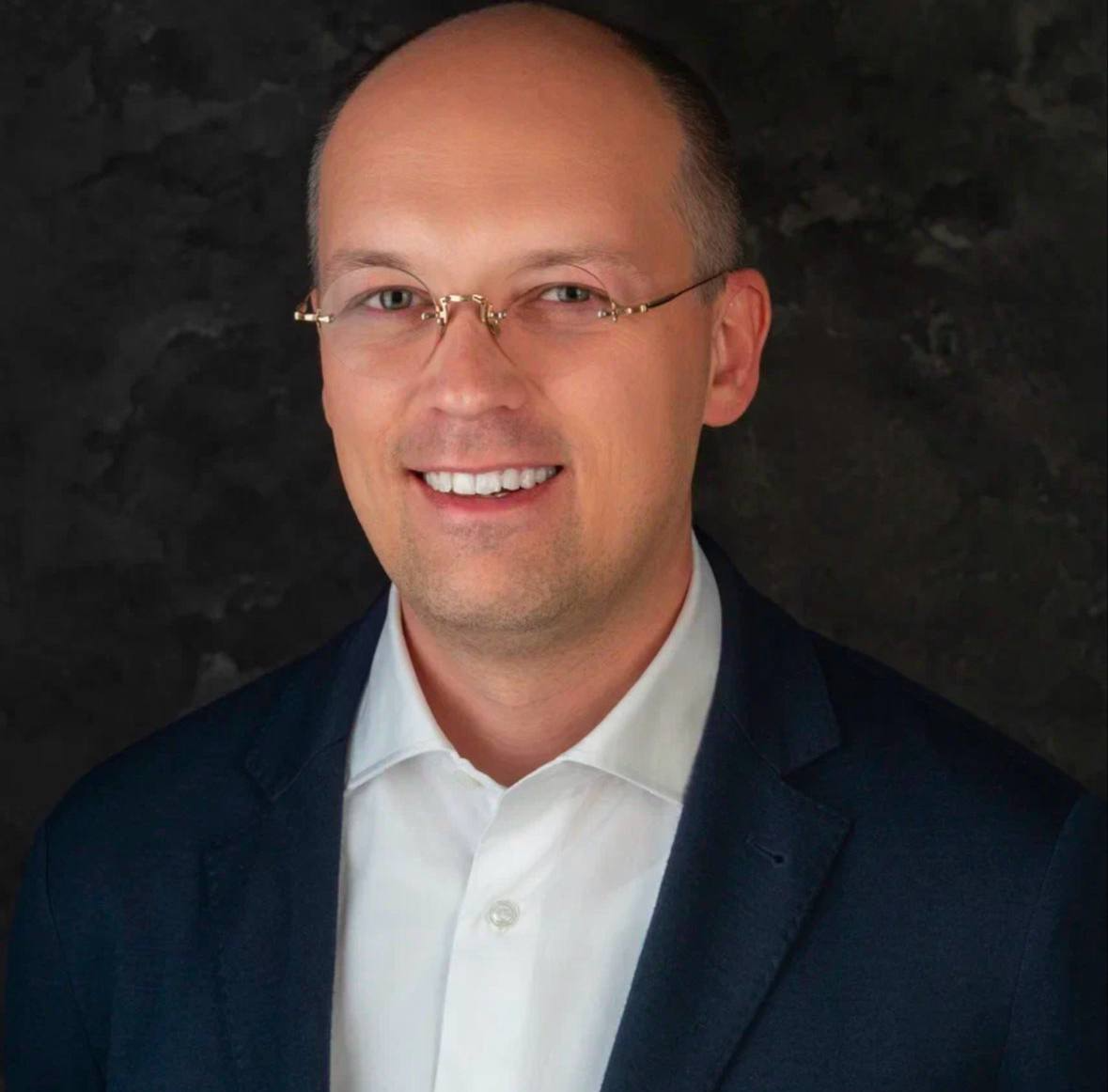
Sergei Mosunov, Faberge UK Limited Owner and CEO, 2025.

Pallinghurst's aim was to restore Fabergé as the leading maker of luxury jewellery by reuniting the Fabergé brand with the Fabergé family. They engaged Tatiana Fabergé and Sarah Fabergé, great-granddaughters of Peter Carl Fabergé, and formed the Fabergé Heritage Council. Prior to their appointments, Tatiana had been the founding secretary of the CERN Physics Department and Sarah had trained as a jeweller.

In September 2009, Fabergé UK Limited launched its first collection and in December they opened a boutique in Geneva. On 6 July 2011, the company launched two collections of egg pendants, including a dozen egg pendants. In 2011, Fabergé was offered in the Fine Jewellery Room at Harrods in London's Knightsbridge and Fabergé opened a boutique on Grafton Street in the heart of London's Mayfair area. In May 2012, Fabergé opened a boutique on New York's Madison Avenue.

In January 2013, Fabergé was sold to the gem mining company Gemfields for 142 million new shares in Gemfields plc, with a value of $90 million at completion of the transaction. After the transaction, Gilbertson, Pallinghurst and its co-investors held some 74% of Gemfields. Other companies continued to try to use the Faberge name but were stopped.

In November 2015, Fabergé won a Grand Prix d'Horlogerie de Genève award, the 'Ladies Hi Mechanical' prize. In 2017, Gemfields invited Ukrainian model Mariana Voinova to be an ambassador. On 3 October 2017, Fabergé unveiled male and female ranges in its advertising campaign and in 2020 they created a $2 million collection called The Emerald Isle Collection in collaboration with The Craft Irish Whiskey Co., offering a range of jewellery and other items.

== The luxury brand today ==
Fabergé UK opened boutiques in London, Dubai and developed a network of authorised retailers who sell Fabergé fine jewellery, time pieces and the company continues to create Fabergé eggs and gifts.

The British Royal Family continues its fondness for Fabergé pieces with Queen Consort Camilla seen wearing earrings, pendants and brooches and the Duchess of Westminster wearing the Myrtle Leaf Tiara upon her marriage to Duke of Westminster Hugh Grosvenor. It was originally made by the House of Fabergé for the Grosvenors in 1906 to be worn by the family’s brides. Celebrities who have worn contemporary Fabergé jewellery including Jenna Ortega, Shania Twain, Lewis Hamilton, Lucy Lui and Kim Kardashian.

In August 2025, Gemfields sold Fabergé UK to SMG Capital, an investment company owned by entrepreneur Sergei Mosunov, for US$50 million. It signalled a return of the brand to a Russian-born owner. Residing in London, Mosunov's success stemmed from his company R'AIN Group, which he founded. The company developed optical materials for infrared and ultraviolet use and manufactured fiber optic voltage meters, inputs for defence and other uses. Upon selling R'AIN, Mosunov moved to venture capital investing.

Shortly after the acquisition of Fabergé, Mosunov, who is owner and CEO, announced plans to invest in developing new collections that would focus on quality and heritage. Prices start at lower levels for everyday jewelry and rise to high value, rare items which are collectible, distinctive or involve more precious gemstones.

In 2025 Queen Camilla wore Fabergé jewellery for her 20th wedding anniversary to King Charles III of Britain, continuing the tradition set by royalty at the start of Fabergé's history.

Fabergé’s renewed international profile was featured in a partnership with Vogue Business, in which the article describes Mosunov's focus on rebuilding the capabilities of the Fabergé maison from product development to retail, with an emphasis on original designs and strict quality control. This includes an evolution of their visual identity and establishment of flagship boutiques in London's exclusive Mayfair Burlington Arcade, in Abu Dhabi, Shanghai and Chengdu.

== Cultural status, collections and museum exhibitions ==
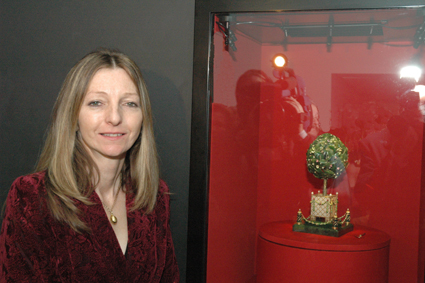
Sarah Fabergé with the Orange Egg.

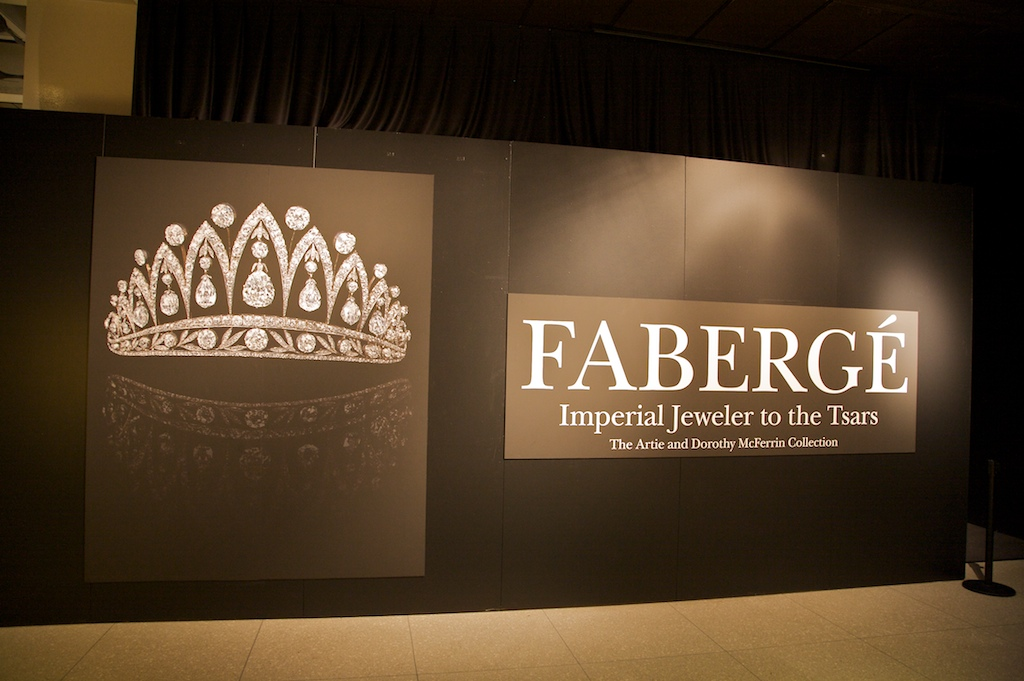
Faberge: Imperial Jeweler to the Tsars exhibit, 2009.

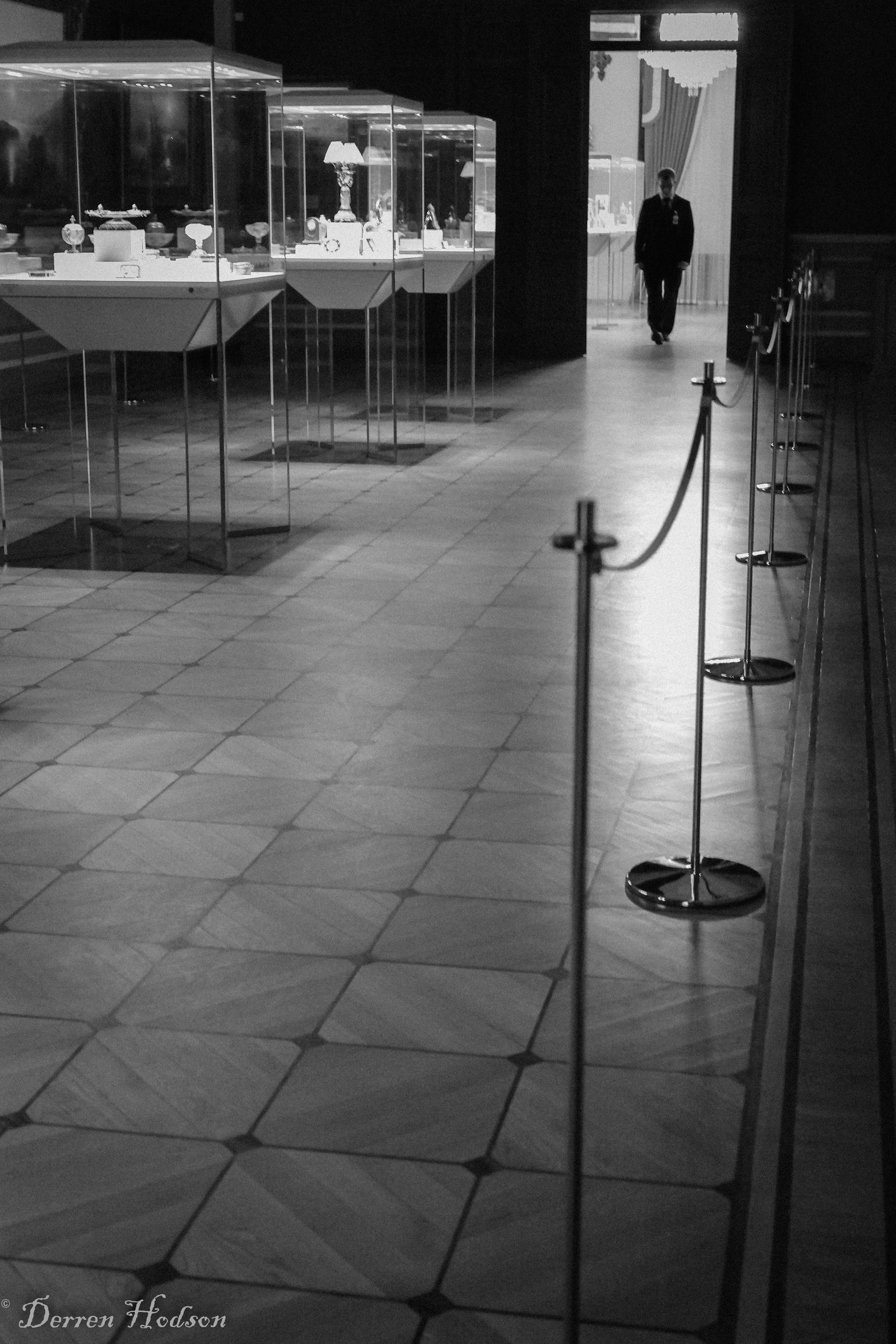
Fabergé Museum, Saint Petersburg.

Fabergé has continued to be collected, referenced in popular culture, and is the subject of regular auctions and museum exhibitions. In 2009, a Fabergé museum was opened by Alexander Ivanov in Baden-Baden, formerly a spa destination for 19th-century Russian aristocrats. It houses an extensive collection of some 1,500 items including the Karelian Birch egg, made exclusively in 1917 for Tsar Nicholas II of Russia. The museum also owns one of the Constellation eggs, which Ivanov claims is the original finished piece, also purchased by the Tsar as an easter gift for his wife Alexandra Feodorovna (Alix of Hesse).

Businessman Malcolm Forbes stirred the imagination of his contemporaries in the 1980s having purchased his first egg in the 1960s and it was later reported that he owned a larger collection of Fabergé items, second only to Queen Elizabeth II. Collector Matilda Geddings Gray, who died in 1971, passed her collection to a foundation so that it could be exhibited to the public. The collection was on view at the New Orleans Museum of Art and at the Cheekwood Botanical Garden and Museum of Art in Nashville. The rare Imperial Napoleonic Egg and Lilies-of-the-Valley Basket from her collection were featured in the exhibition Fabergé Revealed at the Virginia Museum of Fine Arts, Richmond.

Fabergé eggs in popular culture are frequently metaphors for concepts such as the 'ultimate prize', such as in the 1983 James Bond film Octopussy, where a Fabergé egg is the central object of the plot. In the 2004 film Ocean's 12, Danny Ocean (George Clooney) and crew compete with another thief to steal a Fabergé egg from a European museum. In the 2009 film Thick as Thieves, film stars Morgan Freeman and Antonio Banderas play thieves attempting to steal two Fabergé eggs from a heavily guarded vault. In the American animated series, The Simpsons, Fabergé eggs are featured in the episode 'The Last of the Red Hat Mamas' in which a group plans to rob Mr Burns of one million dollars worth of Fabergé eggs. The American television personality Joan Rivers collected Fabergé jewellery and marketed copies on her television show from 1990 to 2014. This was coined by Fabergé specialist Géza von Habsburg as Fauxbergé. In the 2015 TV Series, Bull, an episode called 'A Fabergé Egg (1905)' is about shopkeeper Mr Richards who needs to restore his precious collection, but one of the eggs goes missing.

Continuing its prominence, the hotel Bellagio hosted an extensive exhibition of Fabergé jewels in 2014. Rare examples of Imperial eggs have contrinued to be auctioned over the years.

In 2022, the Victoria and Albert Museum (V&A) in London hosted one of the largest contemporary exhibitions of Fabergé featuring over 200 objects in Fabergé in London: Romance to Revolution. It included three eggs lent by the Kremlin Museums.

In 2025, “The Winter Egg” of 1913, which had been thought to have been lost, was auctioned by Christies for £20 million. It was carved out of fragile rock crystal for the Romanovs.

In 2026, Faberge celebrated 180 years since Peter Carl Fabergé's birth.

== See also ==
- House of Fabergé
- Fabergé egg
- Fabergé workmaster
- Official Fabergé Site

== Other sources ==
- Faber, Toby (2009). Fabergé's Eggs: One Man's Masterpieces and the End of an Empire. Pan Macmillan. ISBN 978-0-330-44024-0.
- Lowes, Will; McCanless, Christel Ludewig (2001). Fabergé Eggs: A Retrospective Encyclopedia. Scarecrow Press. ISBN 978-0-8108-3946-5.
