= Elizabeth Bagration =

Princess Elisabed Aleksandres Asuli Bagration of Mukhrani (Georgian: ელისაბედ ალექსანდრეს ასული ბაგრატიონი მუხრანელი) (1880-1915) was a Georgian noblewoman of the House of Mukhrani.

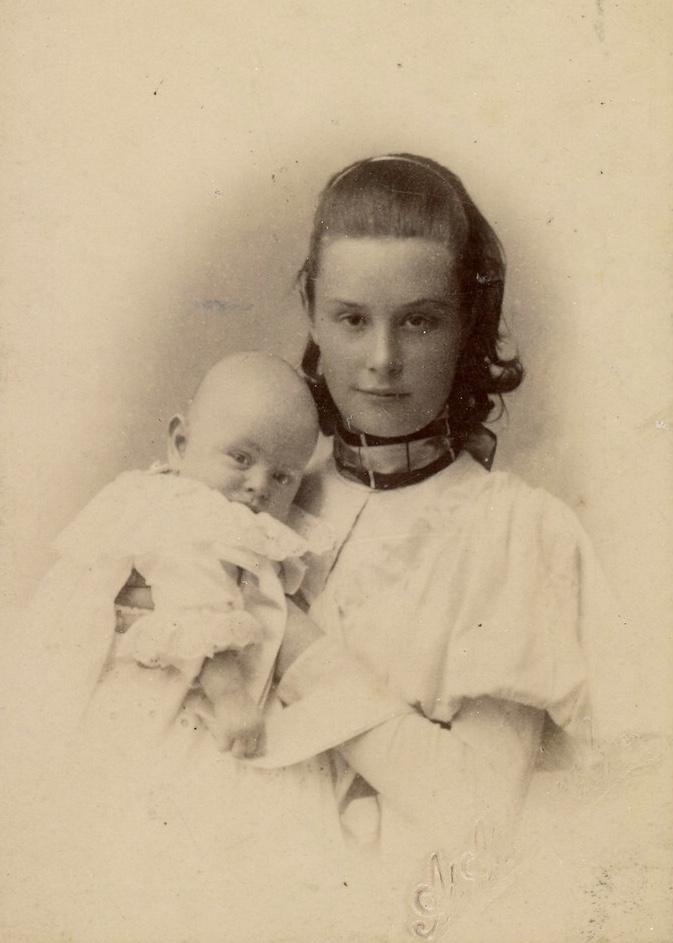
Elizabeth Bagration with her brother 1890s

Princess Elizabeth was born on 14 April 1880.

She was a daughter of Prince Alexander Mikheilis dze Bagration (1856-1935) and Princess Nino Tarkhan-Mouravi (1860-1934).

On 23 October 1899 she married Prince Boris Sergeevych Sheremetev (1871-1952) and had 2 children with him:

- Sergey Borisovich Sheremetev (1900-1996) (born in Tbilisi)
- Tatiana Borisovna Sheremeteva-Fabergé (born 1901) (born in Tbilisi)

On 14 April 1914 she married Marco Morizo De la Roca (1881-1945). She had no children with him.

Princess Elizabeth died on 8 April 1915. She was a grandmother of Tatiana Fabergé.
