= Leibish & Co. =

- Type: Private
- Industry: Diamond industry; Jewellery
- Founded: 1979
- Founder: Leibish Polnauer
- Headquarters: Ramat Gan, Israel
- Key people: Leibish Polnauer
- Products: Natural fancy-color diamonds; colored gemstones; fine jewelry
- Website: www.leibish.com

Leibish & Co. is an Israeli diamond and jewelry company specializing in natural fancy-color diamonds, colored gemstones and fine jewelry. Founded in 1979 by diamond dealer Leibish Polnauer, the company is headquartered in Ramat Gan, Israel.

The company began as a diamond trading business and later expanded into online retail and jewelry production. Leibish & Co. has been particularly associated with the trade and re-cutting of natural colored diamonds, including diamonds originating from the Argyle diamond mine in Western Australia.

== History ==
Leibish Polnauer entered the diamond industry as a diamond polisher. In 1979, after the polishing factory where he worked closed, he began trading diamonds independently. According to a 2017 profile in Die Welt, an early transaction involved sourcing a group of pear-shaped brown diamonds requested by the British jeweler Garrard & Co. Polnauer subsequently concentrated on colored diamonds, which at the time formed a specialized segment of the diamond market.

The company later expanded from diamond trading into retail and jewelry. In 1995, it established the website FancyDiamonds.net and began using the Internet to market diamonds directly to customers. Die Welt described Polnauer as one of the early diamond dealers to offer high-value diamonds directly through the Internet.

The company's main operations are based in Ramat Gan, where the Israel Diamond Exchange is located. A 2017 report also noted that the company maintained offices in New York and Hong Kong.

== Fancy-color diamonds ==
Leibish & Co. has participated in the Argyle Pink Diamonds Tender, an invitation-based sale organized by mining company Rio Tinto for selected pink, red and violet diamonds produced at the Argyle mine.

At the 2013 tender, the company placed successful bids for seven of the 64 diamonds offered. The stones included several pink and purplish-pink diamonds. The company subsequently announced plans to re-cut two of them in an attempt to improve their color grades.

In 2015, Leibish & Co., working with Kunming Trading Co., acquired 26 of the 65 diamonds offered at that year's Argyle Pink Diamonds Tender.

At the 2016 tender, the company acquired a 0.71-carat emerald-cut fancy intense pink diamond graded internally flawless by the Gemological Institute of America. Rio Tinto confirmed to National Jeweler that it was the first internally flawless diamond included in the tender in more than 20 years and one of only three internally flawless diamonds offered in the tender up to that time.

In 2014, the company presented the Purple Orchid, a 3.37-carat fancy intense pinkish-purple diamond with VS2 clarity. The diamond had been cut from a rough stone weighing more than four carats and was presented at the Hong Kong Jewellery & Gem Fair. It was offered with an asking price of US$4 million.

== Jewelry and gemstones ==
In addition to loose diamonds, Leibish & Co. produces jewelry incorporating colored diamonds and gemstones. During the mid-2010s, the company expanded its colored-gemstone offerings. In 2016, it released a jewelry collection in cooperation with gemstone producer Gemfields, using emeralds from the Kagem mine in Zambia.
