= Sarah Fabergé =

British artist (born 1958)

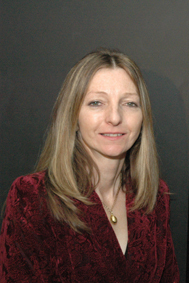
- Born: Sarah Josephine Fabergé; July 1958 (age 67); England
- Occupation(s): Artist, jeweller

Sarah Josephine Fabergé (born July 1958) is the only daughter of Theo Fabergé. She is a founding member of the Fabergé Heritage Council and Director of Special Projects for Fabergé.

== Biography ==
Sarah Fabergé is a great-granddaughter of Peter Carl Fabergé. Her late father, Theo, encouraged her interest in Fabergé. In 1994, after studies in silversmithing, she was invited to create, and approve, some designs for a company called the St. Petersburg Collection which her father was involved with. In March 2004, Fabergé was invited to Saint Petersburg with her son Joshua. With an official reception at the Hermitage Museum, the Mariinsky Theatre, and a major event at the prestigious Hotel Astoria, it celebrated the opening of an art gallery dedicated to the work of Sarah Fabergé and her father Theo. Her creation 'Neva Egg' is on permanent display at the St Petersburg City Museum.

Sarah Fabergé is a Liveryman of the Worshipful Company of Turners, one of the oldest Livery Companies in the City of London. It supports the craft of turning on a lathe and aims to raise the profile of this unique art through its 'Wizardry in Wood' exhibitions and competitions.

In January 2007, Pallinghurst Resources announced that it had acquired Unilever's entire global portfolio of trademarks, licenses and associated rights relating to the Fabergé brand name. Sarah Fabergé resigned from the St Petersburg Collection in 2007 to work solely with the new owners of the Fabergé trademark.

Together with her cousin, the late Tatiana Fabergé, also a great-granddaughter of Peter Carl Fabergé, she became a founder member of the Fabergé Heritage Council. At 9am on September 9, 2009, the Fabergé Company re-launched with the introduction of a High Jewellery collection. Egg pendants followed in 2011 during Paris Couture.

Sarah Fabergé works with Fabergé as Head of Fabergé’s Heritage Council, Director of Special Projects and Brand Ambassador.

In 2023, it was announced that Sarah Fabergé would be Godmother of Regent Seven Seas Cruises' ship, Seven Seas Grandeur and would christen the ship in Miami on 10 December 2023.
