= Alexander Julius Fabergé =

Russian jeweller (1878–1952)

Alexander Julius Fabergé (Note: Also known as Alexandre Petrovich Fabergé. Alexander Julius is the anglicized version of his given names Александр-Юлиус.) (Russian: Александр Карлович Фаберже, romanized: Aleksandr Karlovich Faberzhe; December 17, 1878, in Saint Petersburg – 1952, in Paris, France) was a Russian jeweller. He was the son of Peter Carl Fabergé of the House of Fabergé and his wife Augusta Julia Fabebergé. He had three brothers: Eugen Fabergé, Agathon Carl Theodor Fabergé, and Nikolai Leopold Fabergé. He was known as a co-founder of the store in Paris called Fabergé & Cie.

== Career ==
The October Revolution in Russia was disastrous for the Fabergé business. Most of its clients fled the country, if they were not arrested. The company was nationalized, which took the form of all five of its branches being closed. Carl Fabergé himself was able to get out of Russia in September 1918 and died in Switzerland in 1920. His sons did not succeed in leaving at the same time. Alexander Fabergé himself was able to leave in May 1920, travelling first to Helsinki and then on to Southampton, England, on the SS Dongola. From there, he settled first in Germany and finally in France. With his brother Eugène Fabergé and Andreas Marchetti, Fabergé opened a new store in Paris called Fabergé & Cie.

== Family ==
He married firstly Johanna Tamermann and secondly Nina Belichova and had two children, Alexander Cyril and Irina Fabergé.
