= Agathon Fabergé =

Russian jeweller (1862–1895)

- Born: Agathon Gustavovich Fabergé; October 30, 1862; Dresden, Saxony
- Died: March 29, 1895 (aged 32); Saint Petersburg, Russia
- Father: Gustav Fabergé
- Relatives: Carl Fabergé (brother)

Agathon Gustavovich Fabergé (Russian: Агафон Густавович Фаберже, romanized: Agafon Gustavovich Faberzhe; 30 October 1862 – 29 March 1895) was a Russian jeweller. He was a son of Gustav Fabergé, the brother of Peter Carl Fabergé, and a partner in the famed Russian Fabergé jewellery company.

== Biography ==
Fabergé was born 30 October 1862, in Dresden, Kingdom of Saxony. He died on 29 March 1895, at the age of 32 in Saint Petersburg. Agathon was the son of the famous jeweler Gustav Peter Fabergé and Charlotte Maria Fabergé. He was the brother of Aleksandrine Caroline Koschke, Wilhelmine Charlotte Nicolay, Carl Fabergé and Agatha Emilie Fabergé. He joined his father's house of Fabergé in 1892.

He grew up in Dresden until he was seven years old. From 1870 to 1875, he lived in St. Petersburg where his brother took over the family company in 1872. From 1876 to 1882, he lived again in Dresden and went to the Öffentliche Handelslehranstalt school from 1877 to 1879. The famous jewelry collection of Johann Melchior Dinglinger at the Grünes Gewölbe in Dresden was an inspiration to the jewelry he designed. Agathon joined his brother in 1892 in the House of Fabergé and died three years later in Saint Petersburg of unknown causes.
