= Tatiana Fabergé =

Swiss jeweller (1930–2020)

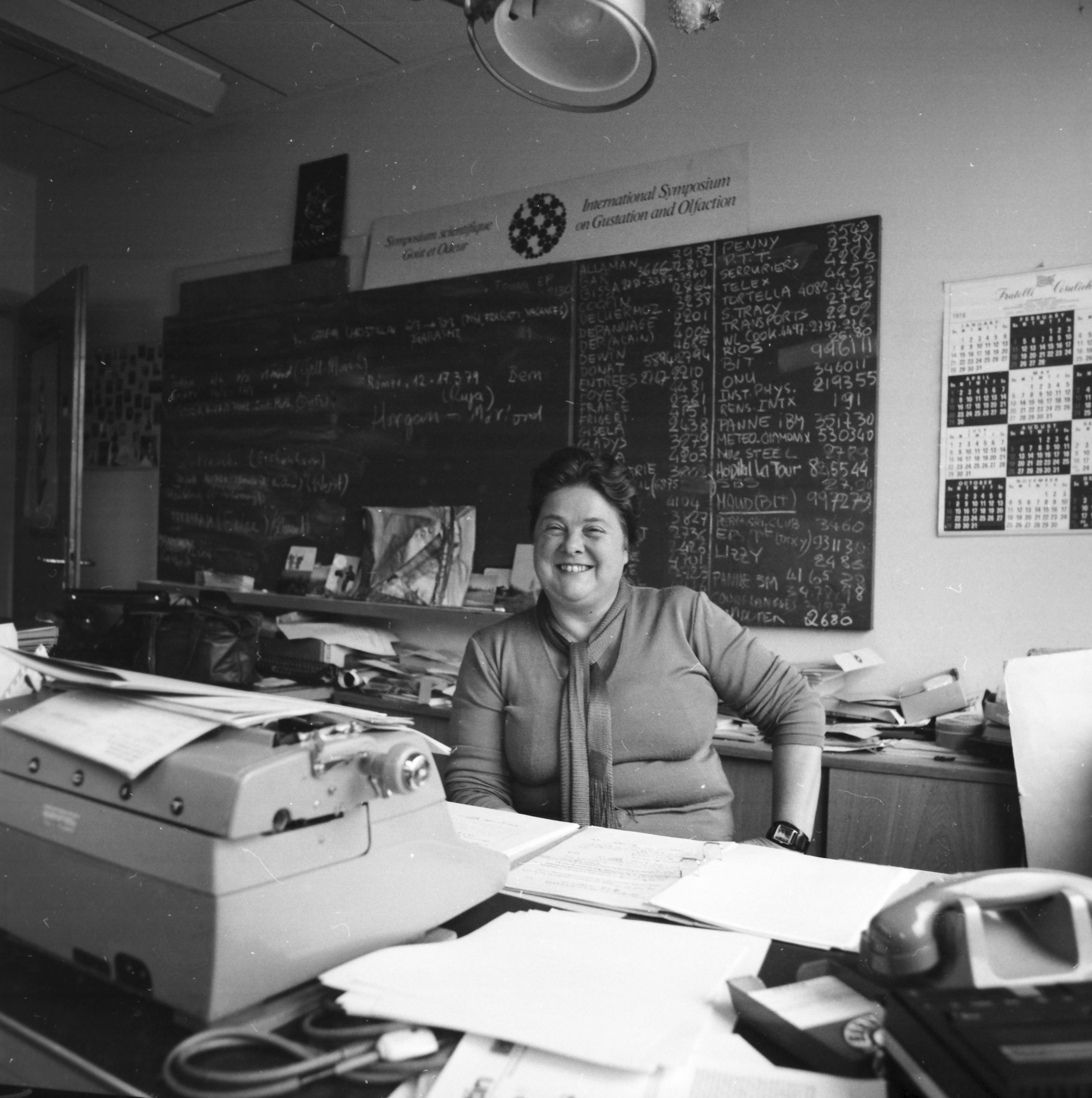
- Fabergé in 1979
- Born: 7 March 1930; Versoix, Geneva, Switzerland
- Died: 13 February 2020 (aged 89)

Tatiana Fabergé (7 March 1930 – 13 February 2020) was a Swiss secretary, Fabergé scholar and jeweller.

== Biography ==
Tatiana Fabergé was born in 1930 in Versoix, Geneva, Switzerland. Her parents were Fedor Fabergé (a son of Agathon Carl Theodor Fabergé) and Tatiana Borisovna Sheremeteva-Fabergé (the daughter of Boris Sergeevich Sheremetev and Princess Elisabed Aleksandres Asuli Bagration of Mukhrani). During the 1950s she studied jewellery design in Paris, where she was in contact with her uncles Eugene Fabergé and Alexander Fabergé. The Fabergé brothers had a store in Paris called Fabergé & Cie.

Tatiana Fabergé joined CERN—the European Organization for Particle Physics Research—as a secretary when the CERN Theory Group was moved from Copenhagen to Geneva. She retired from CERN in 1995.

Fabergé was always interested in the House of Fabergé. After retirement she worked researching the family history and promoting its heritage.

In 1974, she launched her own jewelry and product line Tatiana Fabergé which was marketed through her own web site. During her career she created several products under different trademarks, in 2005 Fabergé Ltd purchased from the Tatiana Fabergé SA one of the trademarks, Tatiana Fabergé SA then continued developing products under the Tsars Collection trademark.

From 2007, she was actively involved in giving advice and guidance via the Fabergé Heritage Council, a division of Fabergé Limited, regarding the relaunch of the brand. She worked closely with the creative team and advised on heritage matters.

At her death in February 2020, she bequeathed the Fabergé family archive to the Moscow Kremlin Museums.

== Fauxbergé ==
According to an article published in 2020 by an art dealer specialising in Russian art and Fabergé, she was involved in authenticating several Fauxbergé eggs as genuine Fabergé items in order for them to be sold:

Valentin Skurlov and Tatiana Fabergé had been teaming up for years. Back in January 2007, Galerie du Rhône (a Swiss gallery in Sion, 100 miles east of Geneva) asked me if I would like to buy a Fabergé egg they had failed to sell at auction a few weeks earlier. It contained a tiny vase of flowers and had supposedly been bought from a Russian aristocrat in Basel around 1930, and housed in a French private collection since 1990. It was an obvious fake – yet came with a kiss of Fabergé approval from Skurlov and Tatiana who, on 2 November 2006, had "examined and appraised" it [...]. Tatiana then asked Skurlov to produce a written certificate, which he did on 11 December 2006. [...] Tatiana Fabergé, who is often quoted in Christie's catalogues, has also placed her signature to a letter supporting the authenticity of this nefarious object.

Some years later I came across an almost identical egg to the one from Sion – same design, same height, virtually the same weight, but with different coloured flowers – in something called the Wiazemsky Collection. This "superior, very rare collection of 69 magnificent objects made by the best goldsmith masters active during the time of the Russian Tsars" included 21 pieces by Fabergé – led by five eggs by Mikhail Perkhin, one of them "possibly" made for Tsar Nicholas II. Amazingly, this never-before-heard-of treasure-trove was "privately for sale" – brokered, apparently, by the Fondation Igor Carl Fabergé in Geneva, who produced a 76-page document presenting the collection in meticulous detail. The Foundation's address and the names of its board-members – including Mme Tatiana Fabergé, Vice-présidente – appeared at the foot of every page.

Likewise, the book co-authored by her and Valentin Skurlov, "Fabergé: A Comprehensive Reference Book" (2012), contains a two-page spread extolling the so-called doctor Metzger egg clock as "a genuine artefact labelled a fake", despite the fact it had been considered not a genuine Fabergé item during a trial in London in July 2008. In that trial, two Fabergé experts declared that Skurlov earned money by producing certificates authenticating forgeries.

== Publications ==
Her publications on Carl Fabergé include:

- The History of the House of Fabergé (1992).
- The Fabergé Imperial Easter Eggs (1997), which incorporates a catalogue raisonné of Fabergé's imperial eggs.
- Fabergé and Saint Petersburg Jewellers (1997), which contains a comprehensive compilation of documents and publications relating to the House of Fabergé.
- Fabergé (2012).
- Fabergé: The Imperial "Empire" Egg of 1902 (2017), the last book in English, which was issued with Tatiana Fabergé's participation.
