= House of Fabergé =

Russian jewellery house to 1930s

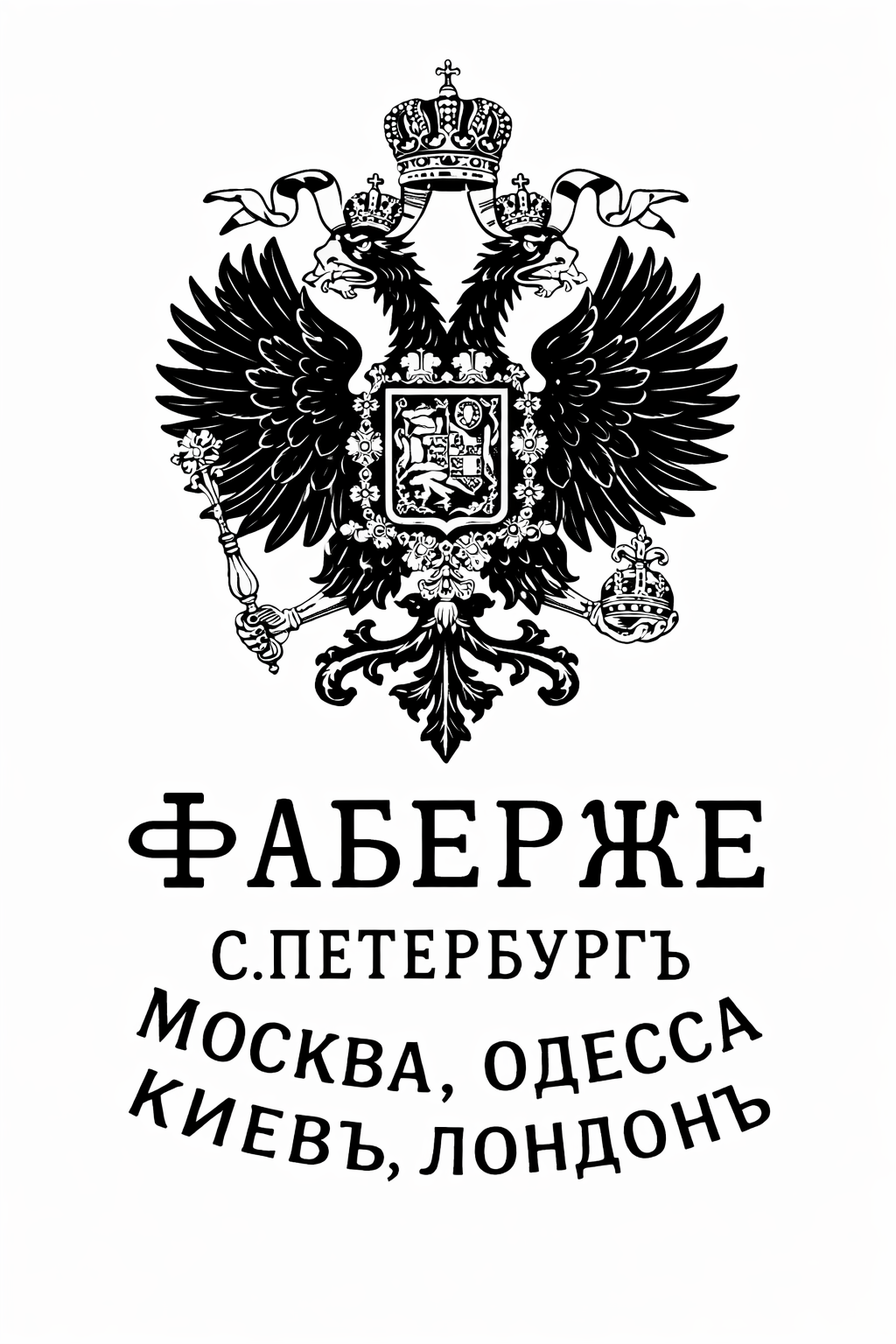
Fabergé historical logo.

The House of Fabergé (French pronunciation: [fabɛʁʒe]; Russian: Дом Фаберже, romanized: Dom Faberzhe) is a jewellery maison founded in 1842 in Saint Petersburg, Russia, by Gustav Fabergé. In 2007, it was re-established as Faberge UK Limited, the luxury jewellery house based in London.

Gustav's sons, Peter Carl and Agathon grew the business until the October Revolution in 1917. The firm was renowned for designing elaborate, jewel-encrusted Fabergé eggs for Russian Tsars, as well as a range of high-quality, intricate jewellery pieces, boxes, desk items, hard stone sculptures and gifts. In 1924, Peter Carl's sons Alexander and Eugène Fabergé opened Fabergé & Cie in Paris, France, making similar jewellery with the firm's stamp styled as FABERGÉ, PARIS.

In 1937 Samuel Rubin started a perfume business using the Fabergé name without permission from the family. After a settlement for the use of the name, Rubin expanded his business and his company was resold many times in which the Fabergé name was used for clothing, other perfumes and colognes such as Babe and Brut, hair products and film productions.

Imitation "Fauxbergé" objects and "Fabergé-style" products occurred during the 20th century but Fabergé eggs continued to develop cultural significance through collections, exhibitions, auctions, television, film and pop-culture references that play on the rarity, quality and value of its designs.

== Early years ==
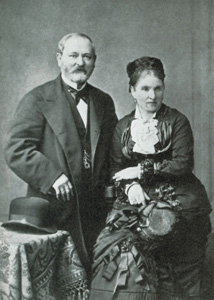
Gustav Fabergé and his wife, Charlotte Jungstedt, 1890s

The Fabergé family's origins can be traced back to 17th-century France, under the name Favri. The Favris lived at the village of La Bouteille in the Picardy region of northern France. However, they fled the country during or shortly after 1685 because of religious persecution following the Revocation of the Edict of Nantes. An estimated 250,000 fellow Huguenots, as the movement of French Protestants was known, became refugees.

During the family's progress eastward through Europe, its name changed progressively from Favri through Favry, Fabri, Fabrier, Faberges, and then to Faberge without an accent. At Schwedt-on-Oder northeast of Berlin, in the second half of the 18th century, a Jean Favri (subsequently Favry) is known to have been employed as a tobacco planter. By 1800, an artisan called Pierre Favry (later Peter Fabrier) had settled in Pärnu, in the Baltic province of Livonia (now Estonia). A Gustav Fabrier was born there in 1814. By 1825, the family's name had evolved to "Faberge".

In the 1830s, Gustav Faberge moved to Saint Petersburg to train as a goldsmith under Andreas Ferdinand Spiegel, who specialised in making gold boxes. Later, he continued his training with the celebrated firm of Keibel, goldsmiths and jewellers to the emperors. In 1841, upon completing his apprenticeship, Fabergé earned the title of Master Goldsmith.

Later that year, he married Charlotte Jungstedt, the daughter of Carl Jungstedt, an artist of Danish origin. In 1846, the couple had a son, Peter Carl Fabergé, popularly known as Carl Fabergé.

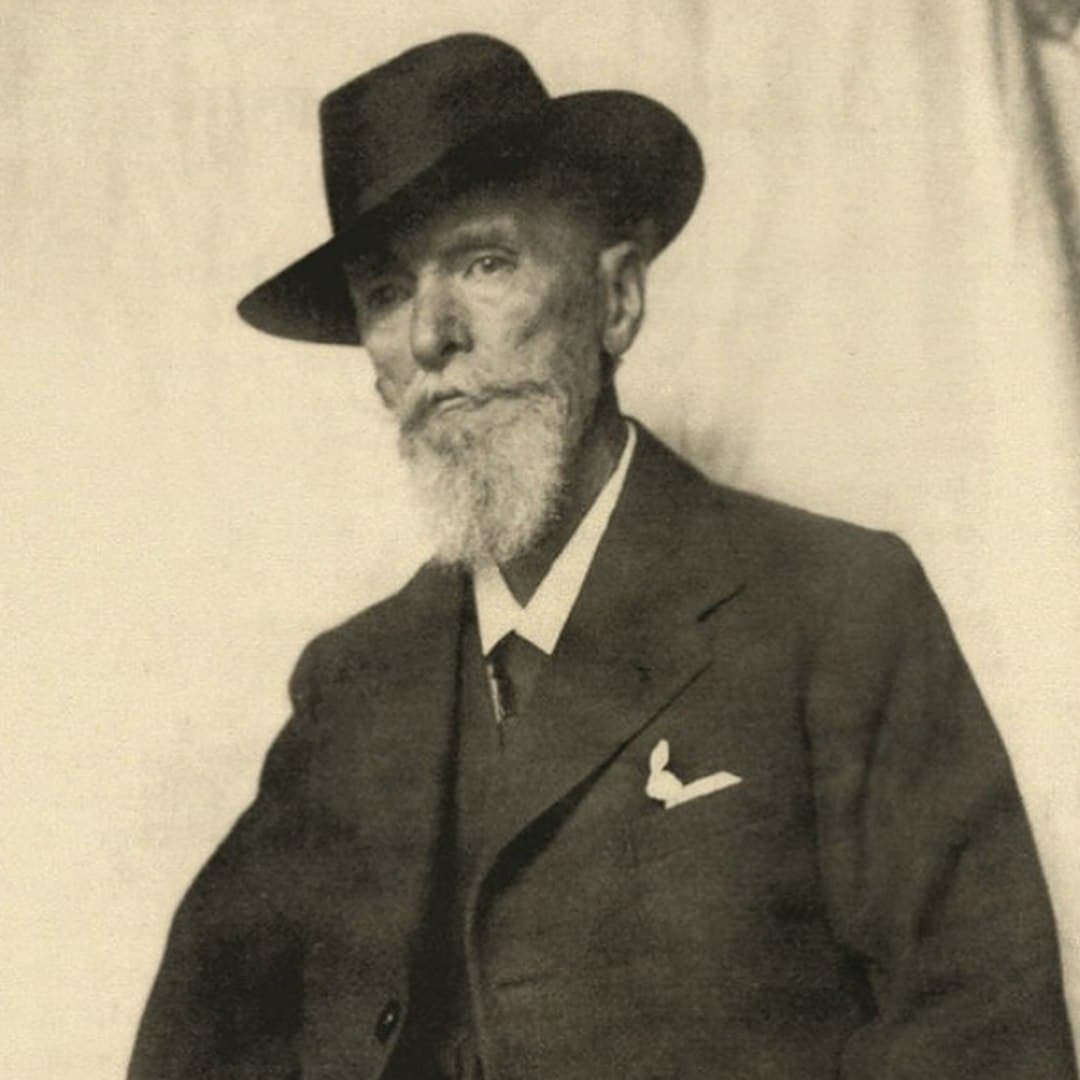
Peter Carl Fabergé.

=== Carl Fabergé ===
Carl Fabergé was educated at the Gymnasium of St Anne's. This was a fashionable establishment for the sons of the affluent middle classes and the lower echelons of the nobility, indicating the success of his father's business. Gustav Fabergé retired to Dresden in 1860, leaving the firm in the hands of managers outside of the Fabergé family while his son continued his education. The young Carl undertook a business course at the Dresden Handelsschule (trade school). Carl was sent to England to learn English, and he continued with his Grand Tour of Europe. He received tuition from respected goldsmiths in Frankfurt, France and England, attended a course at Schloss's Commercial College in Paris, and viewed the objects in the galleries of Europe's leading museums. He was also apprenticed by the jeweler Josef Friedman of Frankfurt-am-Main.

Carl returned to Saint Petersburg in 1864 and entered his father's firm. Although Carl was just 18 years old, he continued with his education and was tutored by Hiskias Pendin, the manager of the firm. He took over his father's firm in 1872. (Note: The year 1870 is also widely but erroneously quoted.) In 1881, the firm moved to larger street-level premises at Bolshaya Morskaya. Following Pendin's death in 1882, Carl was the acknowledged head of the firm. Three other significant events happened that year. He was awarded the title of Master Goldsmith. Agathon Fabergé, his younger brother by 16 years, joined the business. While Agathon's education was restricted to Dresden, he was noted as a talented designer who provided the business with fresh impetus, until his death 13 years later.

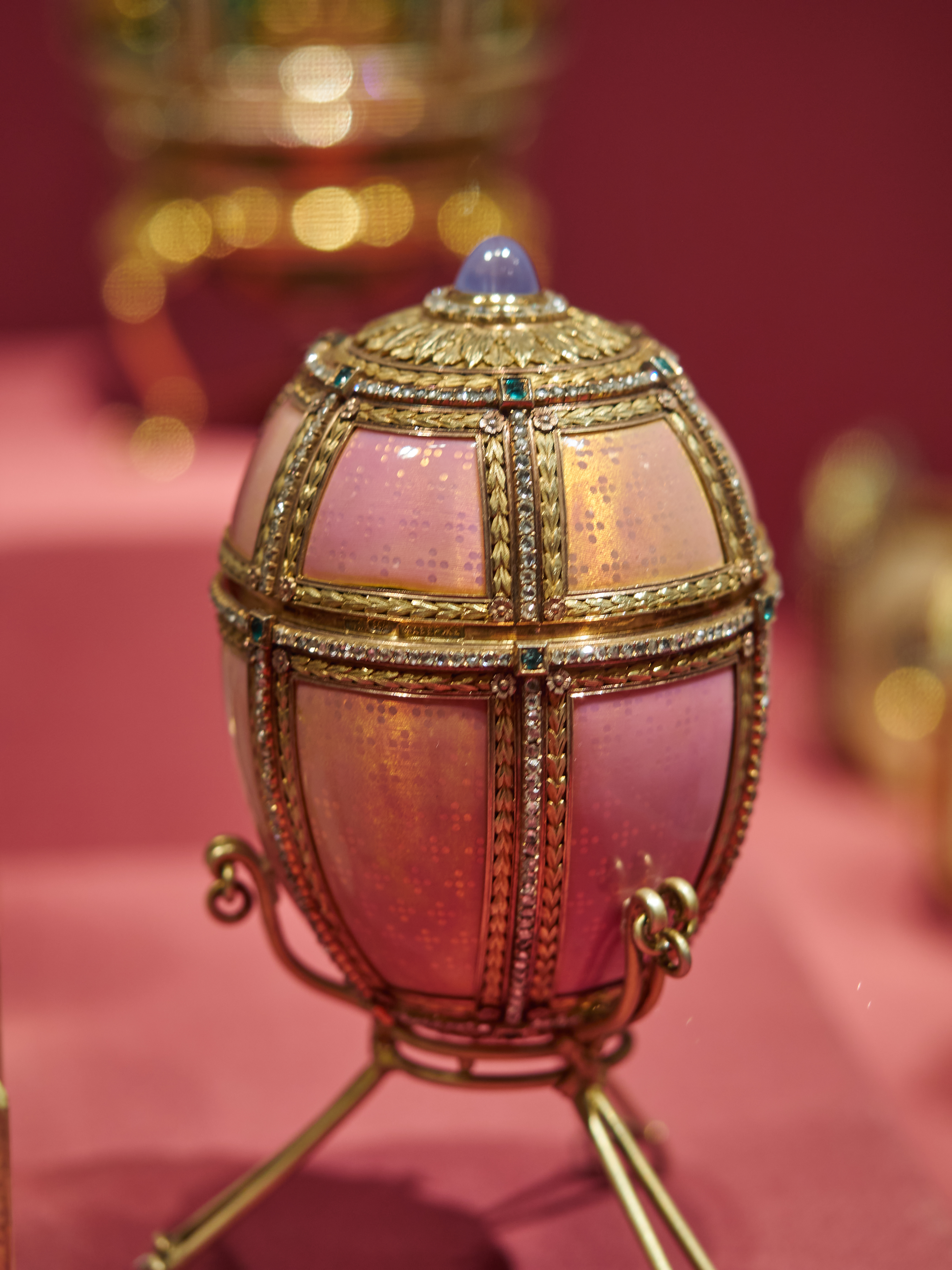
The Danish Palaces egg is a Tsar Imperial Fabergé egg, one of a series of jewelled eggs made under the supervision of Peter Carl Fabergé. It had a fold out frame with six Danish palaces and one Russian palace depicted.

== Rise to prominence ==
Following Carl's involvement with repairing and restoring objects in the Hermitage Museum, the firm was invited to exhibit at the Pan-Russian Exhibition of Industry and the Arts in Moscow in 1882, where Carl and Agathon Fabergé were a sensation. One of the Fabergé pieces displayed at the exhibition was a replica of a 4th-century BC gold bangle from the Scythian Treasure in the Hermitage Museum. Tsar Alexander III declared that he could not distinguish Fabergé's work from the original. He ordered that specimens of work by the House of Fabergé should be displayed in the Hermitage Museum as examples of superb contemporary Russian craftsmanship. In 1885, the House of Fabergé was bestowed with the coveted title "Goldsmith by special appointment to the Imperial Crown", beginning an association with the Russian tsars.

=== The Imperial Easter eggs ===
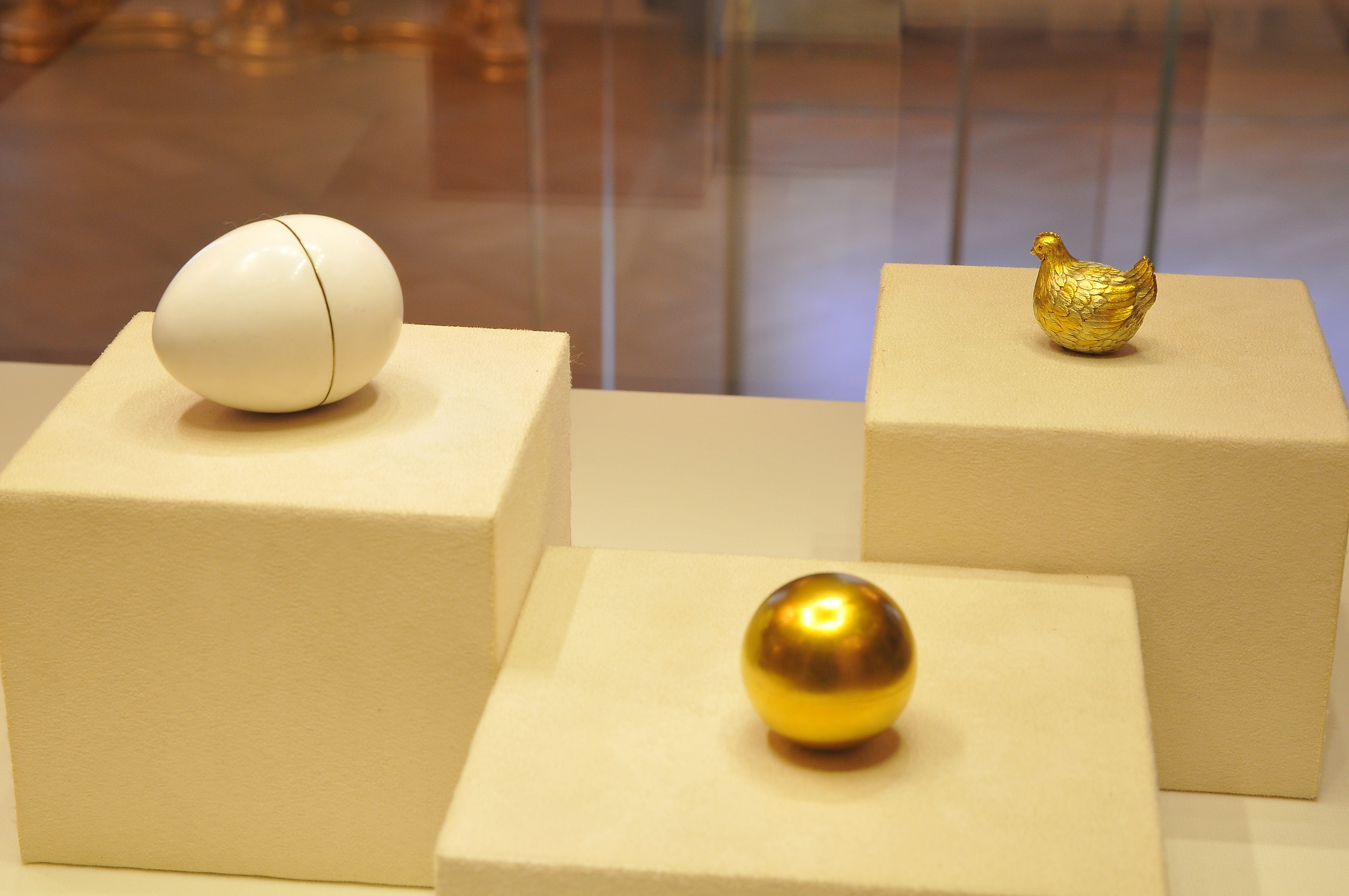
Fabergé Hen Egg with surprise golden egg and hen.

In 1885, Tsar Alexander III commissioned Carl Fabergé to make an Easter egg as a gift for his wife, the Empress Maria Feodorovna. Its "shell" was enamelled in gold to represent a normal hen's egg and its novelty was in opening to reveal a gold yolk, which in turn opens to produce a gold hen. Lastly, the hen opened to reveal a miniature replica of the Imperial Crown from which a miniature ruby egg was suspended. Although the crown and the miniature egg have been lost, the rest of the Hen Egg, as it is known, is now in the collection of Victor Vekselberg.

The tradition of giving a surprise Easter egg by Carl Fabergé continued and he produced 50 Imperial Eggs in total, with increasing detail and elaborate decoration. The form of each egg was a secret and each one was designed to contain a surprise. Apart from Alexander III's gifts to Empress Maria, Fabergé produced eggs for Nicholas II to present to his mother, the Dowager Empress Maria Feodorovna and his wife the Empress Alexandra Feodorovna. Of these, 43 are known to have survived.

=== Hardstone sculptures ===
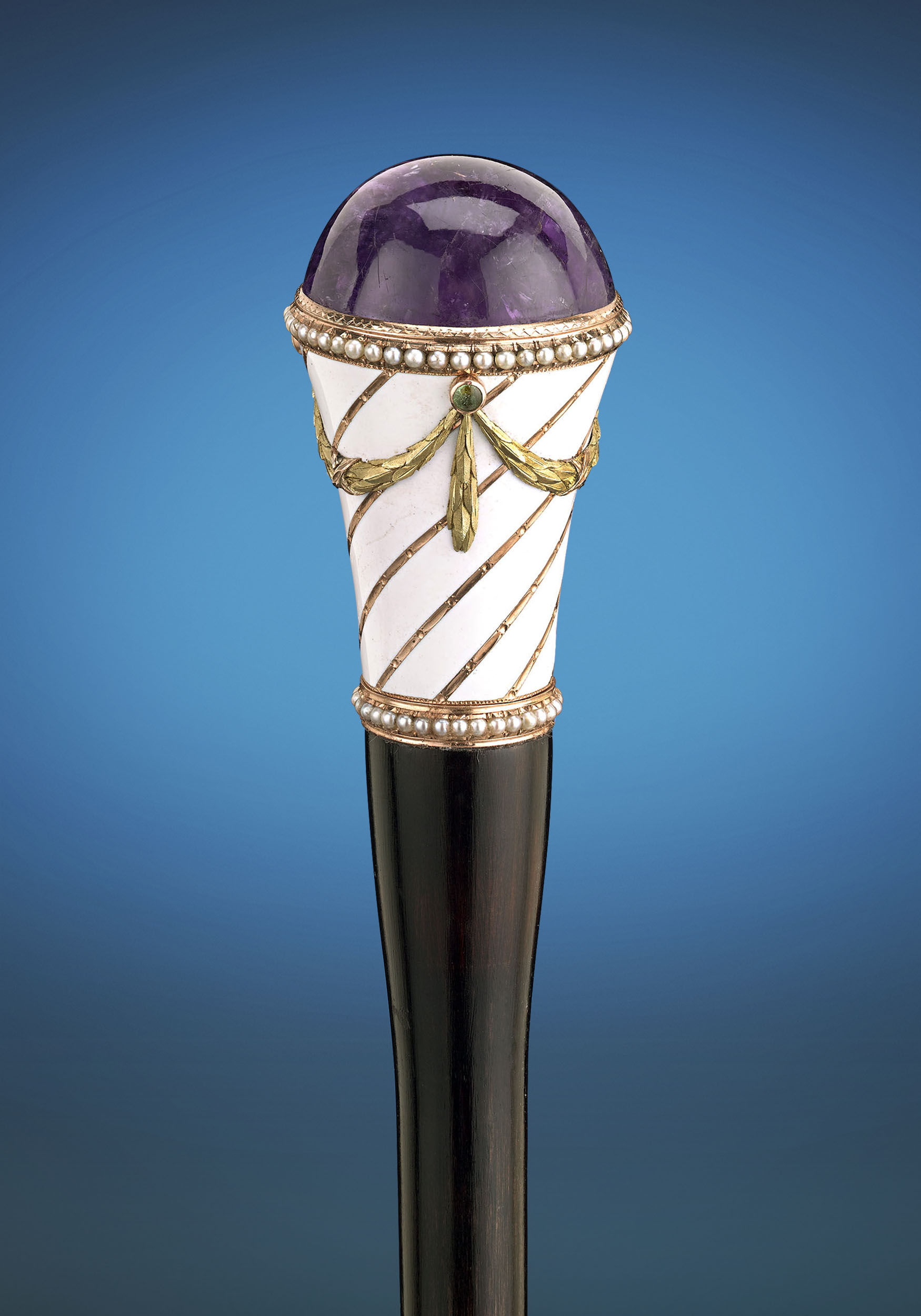
Purple amethyst cane handle by Fabergé with white enamel, rose and yellow gold, and a string of pearls. Circa 1890–1898

Amongst Fabergé's more popular creations were the miniature hardstone carvings of people, animals, and flowers carved from semi-precious or hardstones and embellished with precious metals and stones. The most common animal carvings were elephants and pigs, but they also included custom-made miniatures of pets belonging to the British Royal family and other notables. The flower sculptures were complete figural tableaus, which included small vases in which carved flowers were permanently set, the vase and "water" were done in clear rock crystal (quartz) and the flowers in various hardstones and enamel. The figures were typically only 25–75 mm long or wide, with some larger and rarer figurines reaching 140–200 mm tall, and were collected throughout the world; the British Royal family has over 250 items in the Royal Collection, including pieces made by Michael Perkhin and Henrik Wigström. Other important Fabergé miniature collectors were Marjorie Merriweather Post, her niece Barbara Hutton and even Fabergé's competitor Cartier, who in 1910 purchased a pink jade pig and a carnelian (agate) fox with cabochon ruby eyes set in gold.

=== Other Fabergé creations ===
The House of Fabergé also stocked a full range of jewellery and other ornamental objects. There were enameled gold and silver gilt, as well as wooden photograph frames, gold and silver boxes, desk sets, walking sticks, doorbells, and timepieces. Quality was assured by every article made being approved by Carl Fabergé, or in his absence by his eldest son Eugène, before it was placed into stock. The minutest of faults would result in rejection.

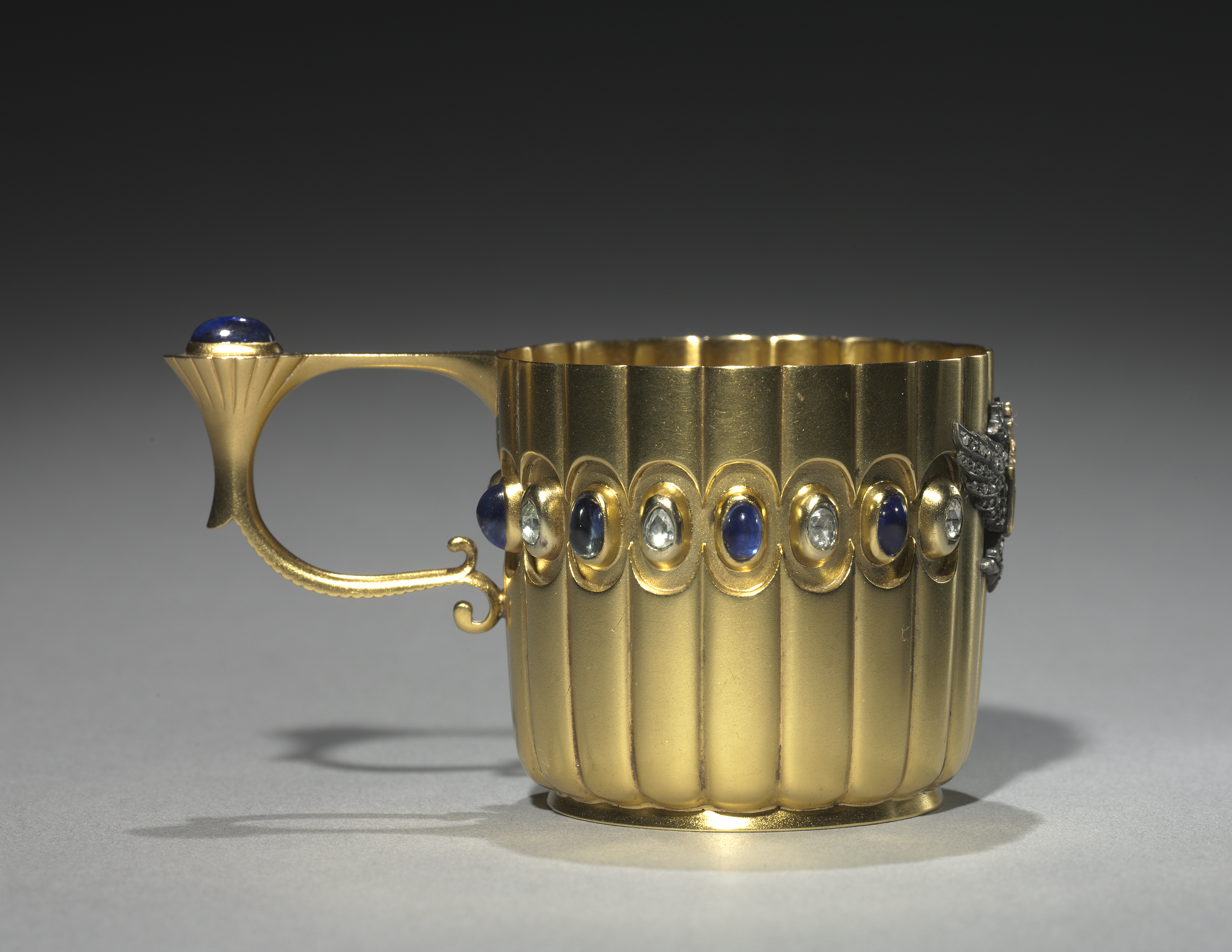
Peter Carl Fabergé - Miniature Cup.

=== Continued expansion ===
The House of Fabergé won international awards and became Russia's largest jewellery firm employing some 500 artisans and designers. In the early 20th century, the headquarters of the House of Fabergé moved to a purpose-built, four-storey building in Bolshaia Morskaia. Branches were also opened in Moscow, Odesa and London. From England, the company made annual visits to the Far East.

Fabergé's work was highly sought after by European monarchs. Among his most enthusiastic patrons was Queen Alexandra, who became "Fabergé's great patroness of the West" and spurred British interest in this Russian jeweler. The wife of King Edward VII and sister to Empress Maria Feodorovna, Queen Alexandra frequently exchanged Fabergé objets d'art as gifts with her family. King Edward VII, along with his son, King George V, his wife, Queen Mary, and later Queen Elizabeth The Queen Mother, were also among Fabergé's royal collectors.

== After 1918 ==
World War I resulted in concern and they experienced declining sales. Faberge's St Petersburg headquarters was closed by the Bolsheviks in 1918. Carl Fabergé left Russia on the last diplomatic train for Riga. The revolution in Latvia started in the middle of the following month, and Carl was again fleeing for his life to Germany, first to Bad Homburg and then to Wiesbaden. The Bolsheviks imprisoned his sons Agathon and Alexander. Initially, Agathon was released to value the treasures seized from the Imperial family, aristocrats, wealthy merchants, and Fabergé, among other jewellers. He was again imprisoned when the Bolsheviks found it challenging to sell this treasure at Agathon's valuations. With Europe awash with Russian jewels, prices had fallen. Madame Fabergé and her eldest son, Eugène, avoided capture by escaping under the cover of darkness through the snow-covered woods by sleigh and on foot. Towards the end of December 1918, they had crossed the border into the safety of Finland.

In Germany, Carl Fabergé became seriously ill. Eugène reached Wiesbaden in June 1920 and accompanied his father to Switzerland, where other members of the family had taken refuge. Carl Fabergé died at the Hotel Bellevue in Lausanne on 24 September 1920. His wife Augusta died in January 1925. Although Alexander managed to escape from prison when a friend bribed guards, Agathon failed in making his escape from the USSR until November 1927 when he, his wife Maria, and son Oleg, together with four helpers, escaped by sleigh under cover of darkness across the frozen Gulf of Finland. Agathon and his family spent the rest of their lives in Finland.

=== Fabergé & Cie, Paris ===
In 1924, Alexander and Eugène established Fabergé & Cie in Paris, where they had a modest success making the types of items that their father retailed years before. To distinguish their pieces from those made in Russia before the revolution, they used the trademark FABERGÉ, PARIS, whereas the Russian company's trademark was just FABERGÉ. They also sold jewelry and had a sideline in repairing and restoring items made by the original House of Fabergé. Fabergé & Cie lost a legal case in Hong Kong in 1984, in a dispute with Fabergé cosmetics over trademark rights in the use of the name 'Fabergé' for jewellery. Fabergé & Cie continued to operate in Paris until 2001.

=== Sale of brand name, 1920s–2000s ===
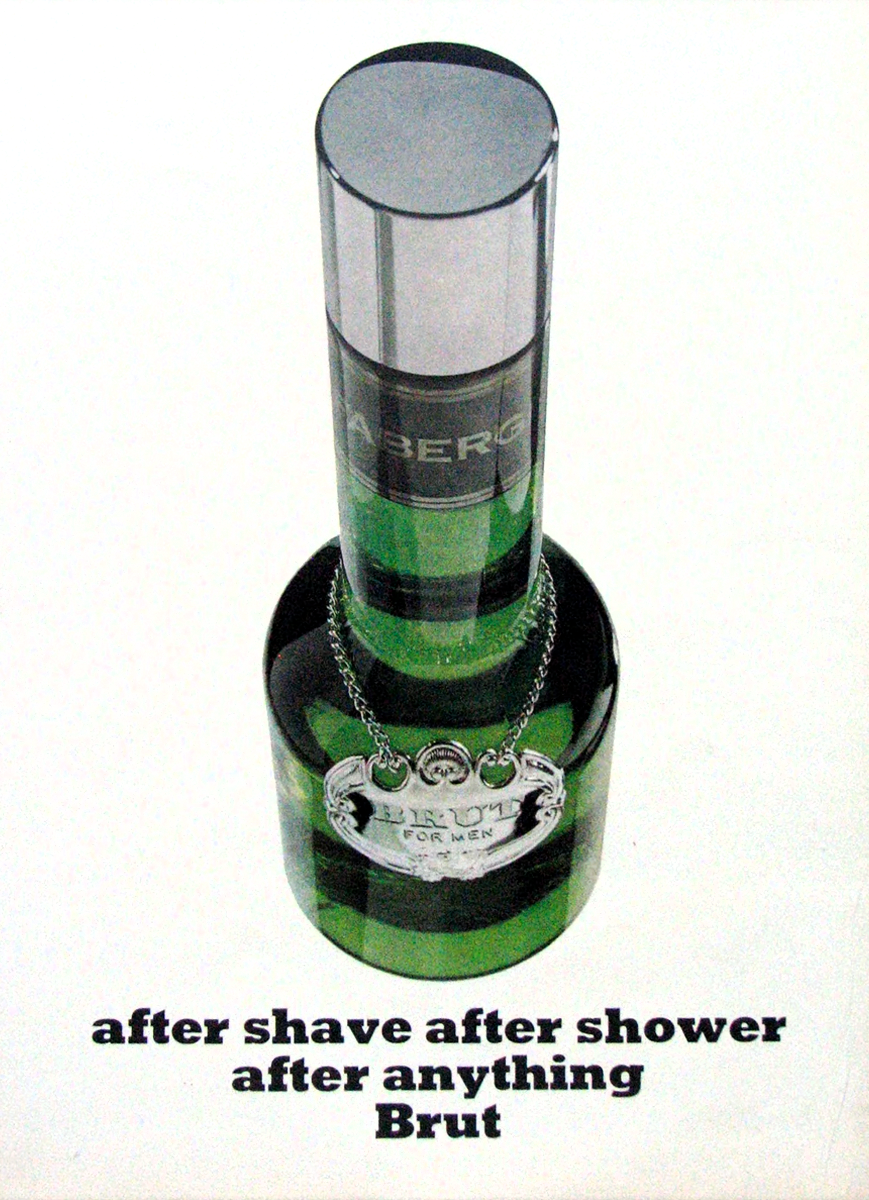
Brut 33 by Fabergé Parfums.

==== Faberge Parfums, Faberge Inc. and other investors ====
During business ventures in communist Russia during the 1920s, American oil tycoon Armand Hammer acquired many objects made by the original House of Fabergé, including Fabergé eggs. In 1937, Hammer's friend Samuel Rubin, owner of the Spanish Trading Corporation (which imported soap and olive oil), closed his company because of the Spanish Civil War and established a new enterprise to manufacture perfumes and toiletries. Rubin registered his new firm in 1937 as Fabergé Inc., at Hammer's suggestion. In 1943, Rubin registered the Fabergé trademark for perfume in the United States.

In 1945, the Fabergé family discovered that their name was being used to sell perfumes without their consent. A lengthy exchange between lawyers on both sides of the Atlantic ensued. In 1946, Rubin registered the Fabergé trademark for jewellery in the United States. An agreement was reached out of court in 1951 with the Fabergé family, whereby Rubin agreed to pay Fabergé & Cie the amount of US$25,000 (equal to $310,096 today) to use the Fabergé name solely concerning perfume.

In 1964, Rubin sold Fabergé Inc. for $26 million to George Barrie and the Rayette Inc. cosmetics company. Rayette changed its name in 1964 to Rayette-Fabergé Inc. and then, in 1971, the company name was changed again to Fabergé Inc. In 1978, Michael J. Stiker filed for the patent rights for Fabergé jewellery in New York on behalf of Fabergé & Cie in Paris, but this attempt to license the jewellery brand failed.

From 1964 to 1984, under the direction of Barrie, many well-known and successful products were launched by Fabergé Inc. Brut became the best-selling cologne in the world at that time, and it remains available worldwide. In 1967, actor and businessman Cary Grant was appointed Creative Consultant and, in 1968, a member of the Board of Directors of the company. Actor Roger Moore became a board member in 1970. Barrie established Brut Productions in 1970 and produced Academy Award-winning film A Touch of Class in 1973, and other films.

Barrie launched the Babe fragrance in 1976, which in its first year became the largest-selling women's fragrance worldwide. Actress and model Margaux Hemingway received a $1 million contract to promote the perfume Babe by Fabergé in an advertising campaign. Babe received two awards from the Fragrance Foundation for its launch: Most Successful Introduction of a Women's Fragrance in Popular Distribution, and Best Advertising Campaign for Women's Fragrance. By 1984, the company had expanded its personal care products. The company also bought other firms and products, including D-LANZ and BreastCare, a breast cancer screening device.

In 1984, Israeli financier Meshulam Riklis' privately owned Riklis Family Corporation acquired Fabergé for $670 million. Many Fabergé products, including the original breast device D-LANZ, were discontinued. The company launched McGregor by Fabergé cologne the same year. New product lines were introduced, including men's, women's, and children's apparel under the trademarks Billy the Kid, Scoreboard, and Wonderknit. In 1986, Mark Goldston was named President of Fabergé. He was acquired the Elizabeth Arden company from Eli Lilly and Company for $725 million in 1986, turning Fabergé Inc. into a $1.2 billion consumer goods company.

==== Unilever and licensing ====
In 1989, an American subsidiary of Unilever bought Fabergé Inc. (along with Elizabeth Arden) for US$1.55 billion. The company was renamed "Elida Fabergé". The deal now placed Unilever at equal first place with L'Oreal in the world cosmetics league, up from fourth place.

Unilever registered the Fabergé name as a trademark across a wide range of merchandise internationally. It granted licenses to third parties to make and sell a range of products, ranging from custom jewelry to spectacles, under the Fabergé name. However, it also continued to sell Fabergé-branded perfumes and toiletries.

In 1989, the German jewelry manufacture company Victor Mayer was given the exclusive licensing rights to produce heirloom quality Fabergé Eggs, jewellery, and watches in 18 carat gold and platinum with gem stones, vitreous enamel, and diamonds. In collaboration with Fabergé expert Géza von Habsburg, new designs for eggs and jewellery were marketed worldwide. The first contemporary Fabergé jewellery and egg collection was presented to the alleged heir to the Russian crown, Grand Duke Vladimir Kirillovich of Russia, in Munich, Germany in 1991. The license with the Victor Mayer company ended in 2009 for jewellery and in 2012 for watches. From 1989 to 2001, Unilever granted licenses for Fabergé products to Limoges and The Franklin Mint for perfumes, dolls, and other items. All licensed products of the time have ten identical trademarks or stamps, a Russian eagle with the words below: "Fabergé Paris - London - New York".

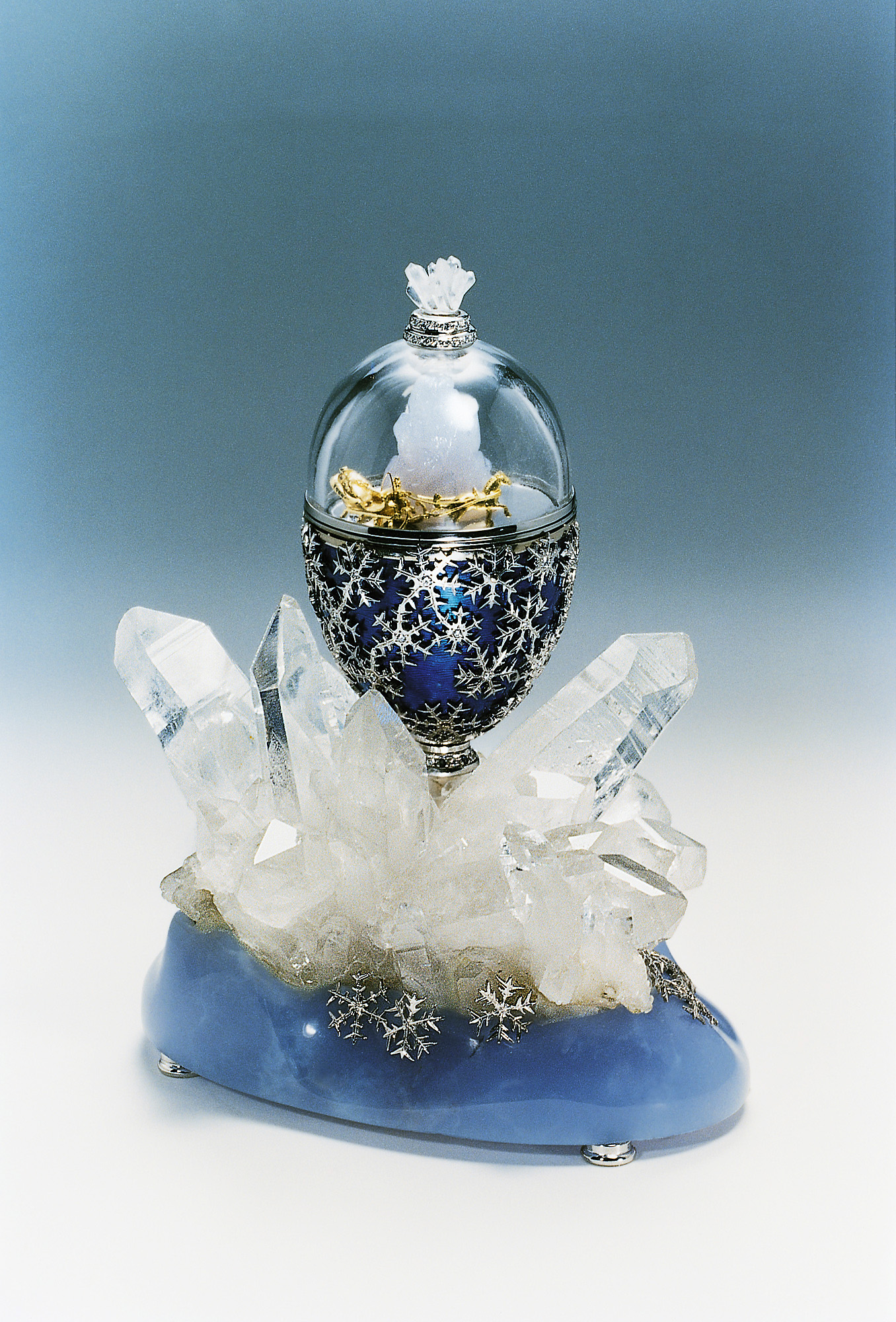
Fabergé Winter-Egg, designed and manufactured in 1997 by Victor Mayer GmbH & Co. KG, Pforzheim, Germany

Lever Fabergé was formed in the UK early in 2001, through the merger of two long-established Unilever companies, Lever Brothers and Elida Fabergé. The new company Lever Fabergé owned hundreds of cosmetics, household and other brands, including Dove, Impulse, Sure, Lynx, Organics, Timotei, Signal, Persil, Comfort, Domestos, Surf, Sun, and Cif. This meant that the Lever Fabergé name appeared on a range of household products, from bleach to toiletries.

In a complicated series of events of personal and professional vendettas between the Russian oligarch and Fabergé egg collector Viktor Vekselberg and his business partner Brian Gilbertson (the former CEO of Vekselberg's Siberian Urals Aluminium Company, or SUAL), the Fabergé brand changed hands several times. Gilbertson received a controversial package worth up to $38 million when he resigned from BHP-Billiton in 2003 and Vekselberg had discussed starting an investment business together after Gilbertson was appointed CEO of SUAL. They set up a joint venture funded by Renova Group managed by Gilbertson. However, the plan went awry in 2006 when they tried to negotiate to buy the Fabergé brand name from Unilever.

Vekselberg, a collector of at least nine Fabergé Imperial eggs, acquired the Malcolm Forbes collection in 2004 for a reported US$100 million. He insisted one of his companies get title to the brand while the benefits of reviving the brand would stay within the joint venture fund.He had most extensive Fabergé jewellery collection but not the Fabergé brand name or company.

=== 2007–present ===
==== Fabergé UK Limited ====
On 3 January 2007, Pallinghurst Resources (now Gemfields), an investment advisory firm based in London and of which Gilbertson was a partner, announced that a Pallinghurst portfolio company had acquired Unilever's entire global portfolio of trademarks, licenses and associated rights relating to the Fabergé brand name for $38 million. The trademarks, licences and associated rights were acquired by a newly constituted company, Fabergé UK Limited, registered in the Cayman Islands.

By October they announced that they intended to restore Fabergé to its position as the leading purveyor of enduring and endearing personal possessions. They also announced the reunification of the brand with the Fabergé family, in particular Tatiana Fabergé and Sarah Fabergé (both great-granddaughters of Peter Carl Fabergé). They became founding members of the Fabergé Heritage Council, a division of Fabergé UK Limited which was to offer counsel to the new company.

In September 2009, Fabergé UK Limited launched its first collection of fine jewellery. In December of that year, it opened a boutique in Geneva. By March 2010, only one of the licences initially granted by Unilever remained in existence. On 6 July 2011, the company launched two collections of egg pendants, including a dozen egg pendants. These were the first pieces to be made by a Fabergé since the family was reunited in 1917.

By November 2011, Fabergé items were being sold in the Fine Jewellery Room at Harrods in London's Knightsbridge, and later in the month, Fabergé opened a boutique on Grafton Street in the heart of London's Mayfair area. In May 2012, Fabergé opened a boutique on New York's Madison Avenue.

In 2012, Gilbertson and a related trust, Renova Group, Vekselberg, and Vladimir Kutnetsov met in court in the Cayman Islands over the original acquisition of the Fabergé brand name from Unilever. The claim by Vekselberg to obtain damages from Gilbertson was dismissed in court. The judge called the lawsuit a personal fight between Gilbertson and Vekselberg.

In January 2013, Fabergé UK Limited was sold to the gem mining company Gemfields for 142 million new shares in Gemfields plc, with a value of $90 million at completion of the transaction. After the transaction, Gilbertson, Pallinghurst and its co-investors held some 74% of Gemfields.

Accounts filed with Companies House in the UK on 25 October 2015 show that Fabergé UK Limited, the principal trading entity, lost £0.525 million for the year ending 30 June 2015. A significant spend in research and development was made during the year in respect of the new timepiece collections launched during the year. In November 2015, Fabergé won a Grand Prix d'Horlogerie de Genève award, the 'Ladies Hi Mechanical' prize.In 2015, a restaurant in Brooklyn was sued over the use of the brand name.

In 2017, the head office of Fabergé jewellery in London invited Mariana Voinova to be an ambassador to the jewellery house the same year. On 3 October 2017, they unveiled male and female ranges of fine jewellery in its advertising campaign. In 2020, Fabergé created The Emerald Isle Collection in collaboration with The Craft Irish Whiskey Co., a collection of jewellery and other items. Marcus Mohr of Victor Mayer created a 'Fabergé Egg' for the collection. The value of the collection is $2 million.

In 2025, the entrepreneur Sergei Mosunov purchased Fabergé UK Limited from Gemfields plc in a deal worth $50 million and holds the position of CEO. Mosunov stated that he planned to invest further in the company to develop pieces that reflect the quality and heritage of the House of Faberge including super luxury pieces which are contemporary and utilise on only natural diamonds, precious and semi-precious stones rather than lab-grown.

== Reputation ==
The reputation of Fabergé as a producer of the highest standard was maintained by publications and major exhibitions, such as those at the Victoria & Albert Museum in 1994 and the Royal Collection in 2003–2004.

Following the end of the Soviet Union and the rise of the oligarchs, Russian collectors sought to repatriate many of Fabergé's works, and auction prices reached record highs. On 27 November 2007, the Rothschild Fabergé Egg was auctioned at Christie's in London for £8.98 million. The Rothschild Fabergé egg became the record price for a piece of Fabergé, as well as the highest price ever paid for a Russian object and the most expensive price for a timepiece.

Many celebrities and billionaires collect Fabergé pieces; Joan Rivers' estate sold $2.2 million worth of Fabergé items at an auction.

The British Royal Collection holds the largest and most comprehensive Fabergé collection in the world, comprising hundreds of pieces spanning Imperial Easter Eggs, hardstone animal sculptures, floral studies, functional objects, and jewelry.

== Museums and exhibitions ==
Faberge and its story has continued to fascinate the public and a wide range of exhibitions and museums have featured Faberge, particularly its Imperial period pieces. This includes the Fabergé and his World (2000) in Delaware, Fabergé/Cartier, Rivals at the Imperial Court of Russia (2003) in Munich Kunsthalle, Germany, Artistic Luxury: Fabergé, Tiffany, Lalique (2008–2009) at the Cleveland Museum of Art (Ohio) and San Francisco Fine Arts Museum, Fabergé Revealed (2011) at the Virginia Museum of Fine Arts (USA) and the ten-year loaned Fabergé Masterpieces (2011–2021) exhibition at the Metropolitan Museum of Art (New York).

Collections continue to be in the Hermitage Museum (St. Petersburg), and the Victoria and Albert Museum exhibited Romance to Revolution (2021–2022) which included pieces from the Royal Trust Collection.

In 2009, the Fabergé Museum was opened by Alexander Ivanov in Baden-Baden, formerly a spa destination for 19th-century Russian aristocrats. It houses an extensive collection of some 1,500 items including the Karelian Birch egg, made exclusively in 1917 for Tsar Nicholas II of Russia. The museum also owns one of the Constellation eggs, which Ivanov claimed was the original finished piece, also purchased by the Tsar as an easter gift for his wife Alexandra Feodorovna (Alix of Hesse).In 2014, the Las Vegas hotel Bellagio hosted an extensive exhibition of Fabergé items.

Christies, Sotheby's and other auction houses continue to sell Imperial Faberge collections.

== In popular culture ==
Due to their rarity and value, Faberge eggs became synonymous with the ultimate prize in popular culture references in film and television programs. In the 1983, James Bond film Octopussy, a Fabergé egg is the central object of the plot. In the 2004 film Ocean's 12, Danny Ocean (George Clooney) and crew compete with another thief to steal a Fabergé egg from a European museum.

American television personality Joan Rivers collected Fabergé jeweller and promoted copies on the show Joan Rivers Classics Collection on QVC. In 1995, she published the bestselling book Jewelry by Joan Rivers which shows original Fabergé jewellery and her copies for QVC. This type of 'dupe' jewellery was coined as Fauxbergé by Fabergé specialist Géza von Habsburg (a play on French word faux (for false or faked) and Fabergé). In 2000, Unilever also granted the Fabergé licence to Mattel for a Barbie collection.

== Gustav Fabergé monument ==
The Gustav Fabergé monument is located in Pärnu, Estonia. It was established on the bicentenary of his birth on 3 January 2015.

== See also ==
- Fabergé egg
- Fabergé workmaster
- Fauxbergé

== Sources ==
- Faber, Toby (2009). Fabergé's Eggs: One Man's Masterpieces and the End of an Empire. Pan Macmillan. ISBN 978-0-330-44024-0.
- Lowes, Will; McCanless, Christel Ludewig (2001). Fabergé Eggs: A Retrospective Encyclopedia. Scarecrow Press. ISBN 978-0-8108-3946-5.
