= Gustav Fabergé =

Russian jeweler (1814–1894)

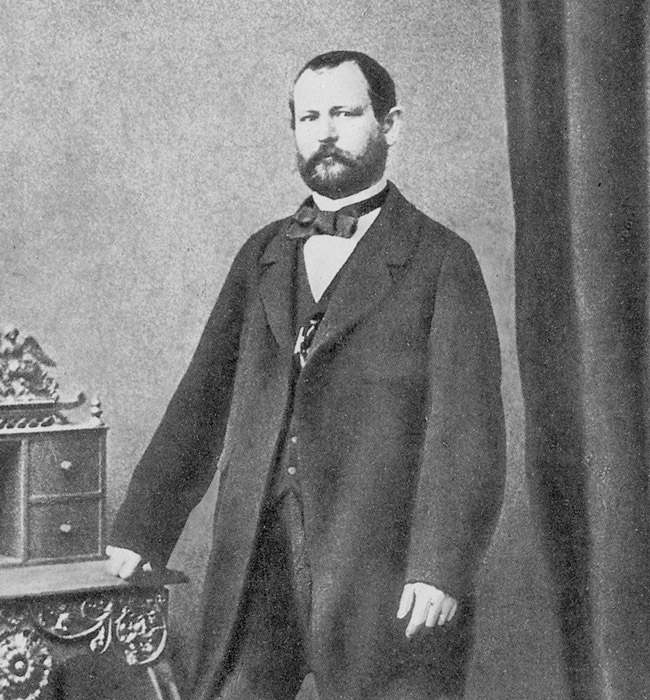
- Fabergé, c. 1860s
- Born: 18 February 1814; Pärnu, Governorate of Livonia, Russian Empire
- Died: 3 January 1894 (aged 79); Dresden, Kingdom of Saxony, German Empire
- Spouse: Charlotte Jungstedt (m. 1842; died 1893)
- Children: 3, including Peter and Agathon

Gustav Fabergé (Russian: Густав Фаберже; 18 February 1814 – 3 January 1894) was a Russian jeweller of Baltic German origin and the father of Peter Carl Fabergé, maker of Fabergé eggs. He established his own business in Saint Petersburg, which his son inherited.

== Life and career ==
Gustav Fabergé, a Baltic German, was born in the city of Pernau (now Pärnu) in Livonia (present-day Estonia) on 18 February 1814. His father, the artisan Pierre Favry (1768–1858; later Fabrier), moved to the Baltic province of Livonia, then part of the Russian Empire. Pierre had moved there by 1800 from the German city of Schwedt an der Oder. He married a Silesian merchant’s daughter named Maria Louisa Elsner (1776–1855). His family were Huguenots from Picardy living in Germany, having fled religious persecution in France at the end of the 17th century, after the Revocation of the Edict of Nantes. In 1796, he registered as a master joiner in Pärnu under the names of Peter Fabrier in 1796 and Peter Faberg in 1808. Their son Gustav was born in Pärnu, where he adopted the surname of Faberge in 1828. Gustav was apprenticed to Andreas Ferdinand Spiegel in Saint Petersburg. He then worked for Johann Wilhelm Keibel in the 1830s.

Gustav qualified as a master in 1841. In 1842, he opened the jewelry firm House of Fabergé in Saint Petersburg, in a basement flat at 12 Bolshaya Morskaya Street, and married Charlotte Maria Fabergé (born Jungstedt), the daughter of a Danish artist, Carl Jungstedt. Among the pieces made by the firm during that time, we find a gold-mounted carnelian demi-parure, a gold-mounted diamond-set brooch and ear studs, and a gold-link bracelet. He employed Johann Alexander Gunst, Johann Eckhardt and, from 1857, August Wilhelm Holmström. The limited information available about Gustav Fabergé’s work suggests that his output was quite modest, consisting mainly of simple jewelry pieces such as agate necklaces, bracelets, and spectacles. It is widely believed that his son, Carl Fabergé, was responsible for introducing innovative designs to the business. Peter Carl Fabergé was initially educated in Saint Petersburg. In 1860, Gustav Fabergé retired and, together with his wife and son, moved to Dresden, leaving the business in the hands of Peter Hiskias Pending and V. A. Zaianchkovski. In Dresden, they lived at Walpurgisstraße and Victoriastraße, a few minutes’ walk from the Castle and the famous jewellery collection Grünes Gewölbe, with the important jewellery of Johann Melchior Dinglinger. Peter Carl continued his education in Dresden. A second son, Agathon, was born to the couple two years later. A daughter, Wilhelmine Charlotte Fabergé was born 1850 in Saint Petersburg.

In 1864, Peter Carl Fabergé embarked upon a Grand Tour of Europe. He received tuition from respected goldsmiths in Germany, France and England, attended a course at Schloss’s Commercial College in Paris, and viewed the objects in the galleries of Europe’s leading museums. He returned to Saint Petersburg and married Augusta Julia Jacobs. For the following ten years, his father's trusted work master Peter Hiskias Pendin acted as his mentor and tutor. Upon Pendin's death in 1882, Peter Carl took over the business and was joined by his brother Agathon Fabergé, who died suddenly at a young age.

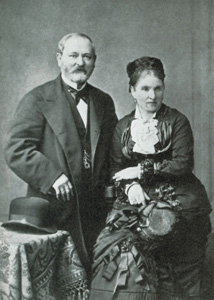
Gustav Fabergé and his wife, Charlotte Jungstedt, 1890s

Gustav Fabergé lived in Dresden with his wife until she died in 1893. He died on 3 January 1894, aged 79, and was cremated in Gotha with his ashes buried next to his wife’s remains at Trinitatisfriedhof (Trinity Cemetery) in Dresden. A grave stone does not exist anymore.

== Statue in Pärnu ==
The Gustav Fabergé monument was revealed in Pärnu on January 3, 2015 in the year of the bicentenary of his birth. The bronze statue is a gift to the city from Alexander Tenzo, the founder of TENZO jewellery house. Composition authors are Alexander Tenzo and Vladislav Yakovsky, the sculptor Eugeny Burkov. The statue was erected with support of the City Government of Pärnu and Pärnu Fabergé Society represented by Tiina Ojaste and Toomas Kuter.

== See also ==
- Pavel Akimovich Ovchinnikov, founder of House Fabergé's chief competitor, House Ovchinnikov
