= Fabergé & Cie =

Russian jeweler

Fabergé & Cie was a jewelry firm founded in 1924 in Paris by two of the sons of Peter Carl Fabergé, Alexander Fabergé (1877–1952) and Eugène Fabergé (1874–1960), together with Peter Carl Fabergé's business partner and jewellery designer Andrea Marchetti from the Fabergé store in London, which had closed in 1918.

== History ==
After their father's famous jewelry company in Imperial Russia was nationalized by the Bolsheviks in 1918, the brothers moved to Paris and continued to make and sell Fabergé-branded jewelry. They also specialized in the appraisal and repair of historic Fabergé items. Their stamp in the jewels was "Fabergé, Paris". The store was located in the most high-end shopping area on 281 Rue du Faubourg Saint-Honoré. From the 1920s to the 1980s, the German jeweler Victor Mayer produced Fabergé eggs and jewelry for Fabergé Paris. The stamp was 'Fabergé Paris, Victor Mayer, year of production'. Alexander Julius Fabergé married his first wife Nina Fabergé (born Belicheva) and had a daughter named Irina Fabergé. He married his second wife Johanna Fabergé and they had a son also named Alexander Cyril Fabergé (1912-1985).

The brand name Fabergé was eventually used by an American company for the use of beauty products. In 1943, Samuel Rubin registered the Fabergé name for perfume in the United States. The trade name Fabergé was not registered as a jewelry trademark in France until 1968. In 1978, a New York Lawyer filed suit on behalf of the Fabergé family but lost the case. Until 2001, Fabergé & Cie maintained the sole rights to produce and sell Fabergé brand jewelry only in France. The Bulgarian born prince Charles Lahovary, a nephew of Ion Lahovary and the Greek princess Emma Maurokordatos. His wife was the daughter of the Fabergé business partner Andreas Marchetti, who was the last owner of the store when it closed down in 2001.
