= Gemfields =

British mining company

Gemfields Group Ltd
- Type: Dual Listed Limited Company
- Traded as: JSE: GML / LSE: GEM
- Industry: Mining
- Founded: September 4, 2007; 19 years ago in Guernsey, United Kingdom
- Headquarters: St Peter Port, Guernsey; (Registered office); London, United Kingdom; (Head Office)
- Key people: Sean Gilbertson (CEO); David Lovett (CFO); Bruce Cleaver (former De Beers CEO) (Chairman)
- Products: Rough coloured gemstones (emeralds, rubies, sapphires)
- Revenue: USD 213 million(2024)
- Number of employees: 1,334 (2015)
- Website: http://www.gemfieldsgroup.com; (Investor site); http://www.gemfields.com; (Consumer site)

Gemfields Group Ltd (formerly Pallinghurst Resources Limited) is a mining company incorporated in Guernsey and headquartered in London. It is the 100% owner of Gemfields Limited, specialising in the mining, grading, and sale of coloured gemstones, particularly emeralds and rubies. The group sells rough, uncut gemstones and does not operate any cutting and polishing facilities. The company is the majority owner and the operator of Kagem Mining in Zambia (emeralds) and Montepuez Ruby Mining in Mozambique (rubies), which industry sources suggest contribute roughly 25% of global emerald supply and 50% of global ruby supply.

== History ==
- 2007 – Incorporated as Pallinghurst Resources Limited
- 2008 – Acquired 75% stake in Kagem Mining in Zambia
- 2009 – Held first emerald auction, introducing proprietary auction process
- 2011 – Acquired 75% stake in Montepuez Ruby Mining in Mozambique
- 2013 – Gemfields Limited acquired 100% stake in Fabergé
  - Gemfields buys Fabergé in $142m deal
  - Fabergé holds promise for Gemfields - Investors' Chronicle
  - GemfieldsCompany acquires Fabergé for $142m
  - Emerald miner Gemfields buys Fabergé
- 2014 – Held first ruby auction
- 2018 – Changed company name to Gemfields Group Limited.
  - Pallinghurst Resources Rebrands Itself as Gemfields Group
- 2020 – Relisted on London AIM; maintained JSE listing.
- 2024 – Announced appointment of Bruce Cleaver as Chairman
  - Gemfields’ Bruce Cleaver: ‘We’re like De Beers was 30 years ago’
- 2025 – Undertook USD 30 M equity raise
  - Gemfields seeks to raise $30m through a rights issue
  - Gemfields raises $30m through rights issue
- 2025 – Sold 100% stake in Fabergé, enabling full focus on mining coloured gems
  - Gemfields sells Fabergé for $50m to focus on rubies and emeralds
  - Gemfields Sells Historic Fabergé Brand For $50 Million To SMG Capital
  - Gemfields Group Sells Fabergé Eggs Maker for $50 Million - Bloomberg

== Mines ==
=== Kagem Mining Limited (Kagem), Zambia ===
- Gemfields holds a 75% stake (remaining 25% held by Zambian government via IDC).
- Kagem is believed to be the world's single largest producing emerald mine.
- Notable emeralds found in the Kagem deposit include the ‘Inkalamu’, the Lion Emerald, a 5,655 carat Zambian emerald crystal with remarkable clarity and a perfectly balanced golden green hue, Chipembele (‘rhino’) which holds the Guinness World Record for largest uncut emerald (World's largest uncut emerald weighs hefty 1.5 kg | Guinness World Records), and Imboo (‘buffalo’) (Massive ‘buffalo’ emerald sold in Gemfields auction | News24) at 11,685 carats.

=== Montepuez Ruby Mining Limitada (MRM), Mozambique ===
- Gemfields holds a 75% stake (remaining 25% held by Mozambican company Mwiriti Limitada).
- The MRM mine is believed to be situated on one of the most significant recently discovered ruby deposits in the world.
- Notable rubies found at MRM include the Rhino Ruby (40.23 carats), and the Eyes of the Dragon (45 carats).
- MRM is constructing a second processing plant (PP2), which is expected to triple the mine's rough ruby processing capacity and estimated to begin operations in 2025.
- Multiple news reports explain how the mine's location and its rich ruby deposit have attracted smuggling syndicates to the region. This has resulted in several violent incursions on the MRM concession.

== Subsidiaries ==
=== Fabergé ===
- Gemfields Group Limited (then Pallinghurst Resources Limited) bought up the Fabergé trademarks, licenses and associated rights related to the name in 2007, reversing the fragmentation of the brand over the past 90 years, and reinstated connections with the Fabergé family;
- Gemfields Limited acquired 100% stake in Fabergé in January 2013, enabling high-profile marketing of coloured gemstones;
  - Fabergé Completes Merger with Colored Gemstone Company
  - Gemfields buys Fabergé to create gem champion
- Gemfields Limited sold 100% stake in Fabergé amid Group-wide cash constraints, in order to focus portfolio on the mining of coloured gemstones
  - Gemfields considers selling Fabergé as it cuts costs.
  - Gemfields sells Fabergé for $50m to focus on rubies and emeralds.

== Corporate governance ==
- Chairman: Bruce Cleaver (formerly CEO at De Beers)
  - Gemfields’ Bruce Cleaver: ‘We’re like De Beers was 30 years ago’
- CEO: Sean Gilbertson.
- CFO: David Lovett.
- Non-Executive Directors: Bruce Cleaver (Chair); Kieran Daly; Kwape Mmela; Mary Reilly; Patrick Sacco; Simon Scott; Louis du Preez
- Major shareholders: Assore International Holdings (approximately 26-29%), Rational Expectations, Oasis.

== Legal and regulatory developments ==
- Anti-Bribery Case in Madagascar: In mid 2024, Romy Andrianarisoa, ex-chief of staff to Madagascar's president, and associate Philippe Tabuteau were convicted in London for attempting to solicit approximately CHF 270,000 (≈USD 300,000) plus a 5% equity stake from Gemfields in exchange for a sapphire mining license. The pair were arrested in 2023 after Gemfields reported the approach to the UK National Crime Agency. Andrianarisoa received a 3.5-year sentence; Tabuteau received 2 years 3 months. First-ever foreign public official convicted under the UK's Bribery Act 2010.
  - Madagascan presidential aide charged with seeking £225,000 bribe in UK
  - The former chief of staff to the Malagasy president, prosecuted in London, was found guilty of corruption.

== Controversies ==
- 2019 Human Rights Settlement: Agreed, on a no-admission-of-liability basis, the settlement of all claims brought by an English law firm on behalf of individuals living in the vicinity of MRM's mining concession. The settlement figure was GBP 5.8 million comprising the sum to be distributed to the claimants and legal expenses of the law firm acting on their behalf.
- 2024 Anti-Bribery Scandal: As detailed above.
- 2024–25 Market Challenges: Strategic cost-cutting has drawn investor attention; share price dropped approximately 50%.
  - Gemfields shares slide as it addresses market challenges - Sharecast.com
  - Gemfields Suspends Emerald Mining Amid Market Pressures and Focuses on Ruby Growth
  - Gemfields to Halt Some Operations and Sell Businesses
