= Agathon Carl Theodor Fabergé =

Russian goldsmith and philatelist (1876–1951)

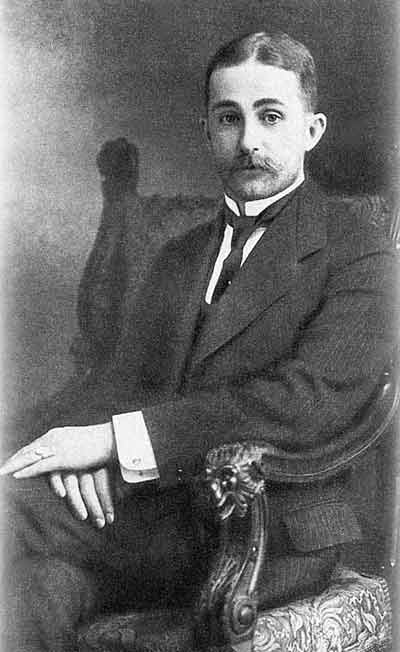
Faberge in the 1900s

Agathon Karlovich Fabergé (German: Agathon Carl Theodor Fabergé; Russian: Агафон Карлович Фаберже, romanized: Agafon Karlovich Faberzhe; 24 January [O.S. 5 February] 1876 – 20 October 1951) was a Russian goldsmith and philatelist. He was the second son of Peter Carl Fabergé. In 1927, he fled the Soviet Union and settled in Finland, where he obtained a Nansen passport and resided until his death.

== Early life ==
Agathon Karlovich was born in 1876; he was educated at the Petrischule in St. Petersburg and at the Commercial Department of Dr. Wiedemann's gymnasium. On 20 October 1894 (O.S.), he joined his father's firm, the House of Fabergé, at the same time as Eugene (Evgeny). In the 1900s to 1910s, together with his father and his brother, Eugene, he managed the firm's business. After 1898, he became an expert on the Diamond Room in the Winter Palace.

== Philately ==
Fabergé formed a leading collection of Russian Zemstvo stamps.

After the success at the World Exhibition in Paris in 1900, the Faberge Company became a supplier to numerous monarchs. Agafon Fabergé spoke five languages and was a company representative at the royal houses of England, Sweden, Norway, and Siam. In 1897, Fabergé married Lydia Treyberg, daughter of a wealthy Riga merchant. Following the birth of the couple's fourth son in 1907, his father presented Agafon a country estate (known as Dacha Fabergé) that included a two-store wooden main house, in Levashovo, near St. Petersburg. Agathon commissioned the architect Johannes Leopold Hulnbeck to rebuild it. Galnbeck built an impressive Art Nouveau stone mansion on the site of the old house. Contemporaries called the estate the “Small Hermitage”, due to its decoration with antique furniture, carpets and tapestries, porcelain and bronze, prints, icons, miniatures and sculptures. There were two unique collections — precious stones and stamps.

Breytfuss Friedrich (1850–1911), a Russian-German stamp collector from St. Petersburg, stimulated Fabergé's interest in collecting stamps.

In 1916, Faberge retired from his father’s company and opened up an antique shop. After the February Revolution of 1917 against the tsar, the antique trade was very busy. Wealthy people leaving Russia sold rarities. There was no shortage of the buyers — the nouveau riche millionaires. The October Bolshevik coup made Faberge close the shop. There began lootings and robberies.

In June 1918, Faberge reopened the antique shop. But later, the terror unleashed by the Bolsheviks forced him to smuggle his wife and five children to Finland. In December 1918, the Bolsheviks closed all the antique shops. Faberge found a job as a translator in the Danish embassy. Six months later, according to the new denunciation, he was arrested by security officers, this time on charges of profiteering and sent to a concentration camp. Shortly after his arrest, there was a pogrom at his dacha. Everything that could not be taken away was disfigured and broken. He spent more than a year in a concentration camp, where he was considered as a "bourgeois counter-revolutionary" and was taken out to be shot three times. Age 44, he had become old and gray-haired; his house, villa and property were confiscated.

In the late 1920’s, the officials involved Faberge in an urgent secret work — evaluation of a large lot of diamonds. After signing the peace with Estonia, the Bolsheviks found a channel for smuggling gold and precious stones. The interested traders came to Revel to participate in clandestine auctions. Having learned that the Bolsheviks brought “buckets” of diamonds, they decided to bring down the price and refused to buy the stones. A trade representative telegraphed Lenin that the experts deliberately overstated the price, and it was impossible to sell the stones. Faberge was arrested again on charges of sabotage. After some time, the authorities learned about his connections with the staff of the Finnish diplomatic mission and decided to make him their agent. He came out of prison only after he had given his agreement to work for the GPU. But Faberge did not want to have it on his conscience, so he confessed everything to his Finnish friends. For a while he tried to get some work. Academician A.E. Fersman helped him; he invited him to work in the commission to study production forces of Russia at the Academy of Sciences.

== Death ==
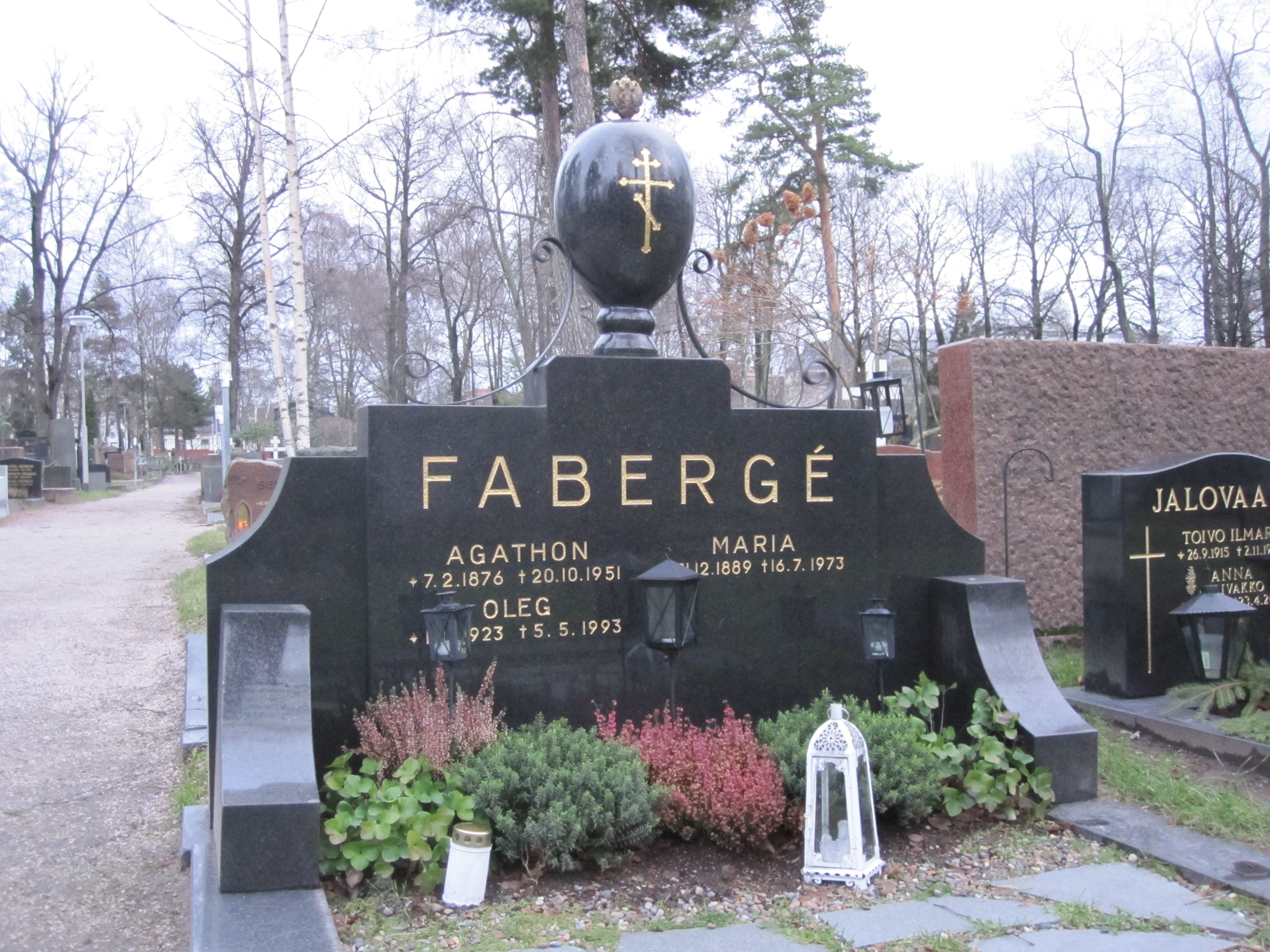
Fabergé family grave in the Hietaniemi Cemetery.

Fabergé died in Helsinki, Finland on 20 October 1951. He was buried in the family grave at the Hietaniemi Cemetery.

== See also ==
- Georges Henri Kaestlin

== Sources ==
- Dolgova, A. I. (2014). "Черты модерна в интерьере загородного дома агафона Фаберже в Осиновой роще" [Art Nouveau in the Interior of Agathon Faberge’s Country house in Osinovaya Roshcha] (PDF). Scientific Papers (in Russian). 28: 126.
