= Peter Carl Fabergé =

Russian jeweller (1846–1920)

- Петер Карл Фаберже
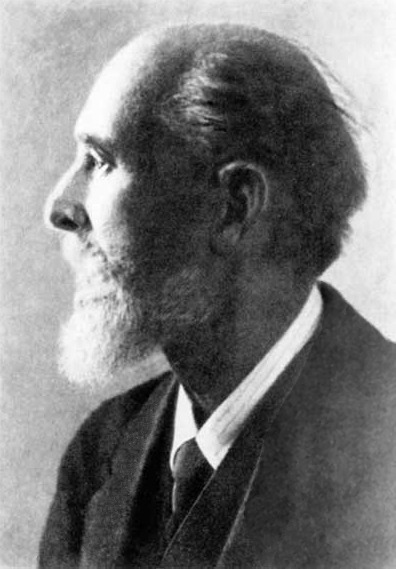
- Born: 30 May [O.S. 18 May] 1846; Saint Petersburg, Russia
- Died: 24 September 1920 (aged 74); Lausanne, Switzerland
- Other name: Karl Gustavovich Fabergé
- Notable work: Fabergé egg
- Spouse: Augusta Julia Jacobs (m. 1872)
- Children: 5, including Agathon and Alexander
- Father: Gustav Fabergé
- Relatives: Agathon Fabergé (brother)

Peter Carl Gustavovich Fabergé (Note: His patronymic is sometimes spelled as Gustavovitch.) (Russian: Петер Карл Густавович Фаберже, romanized: Peter Karl Gustavovich Faberzhe; 30 May [O.S. 18 May] 1846 – 24 September 1920; also known as Charles Fabergé) was a Russian goldsmith and jeweller. He is best known for creating Fabergé eggs made in the style of genuine Easter eggs, but using precious metals and gemstones rather than more mundane materials. He was one of the sons of Gustav Fabergé, the founder of the House of Fabergé.

== Early life and education ==
Peter Carl Fabergé was born on 30 May [O.S. 18 May] 1846 in Saint Petersburg, Russia, into the family of the Baltic German jeweller of Huguenot descent, Gustav Fabergé, and his wife Charlotte Jungstedt, the daughter of Danish painter Karl Jungstedt. Gustav Fabergé's paternal ancestors were Huguenots, originally from La Bouteille, Picardy, who fled from France after the revocation of the Edict of Nantes, first to Germany near Berlin, then in 1800 to the Pernau county (today Pärnu), Livonia Governorate, then part of Russia, now in Estonia.

His father retired from his jewelry business in 1860 and moved with his family to Dresden, the capital of Saxony; he left the House of Fabergé in Saint Petersburg in the hands of his business partner, Hiskias Pendin. Carl enrolled at the Dresden Handelsschule (trade school), a place where the sons of Saxon merchants studied the basics of business administration. In 1862, Agathon Fabergé was born in Dresden, where he went to school as well.

Carl was sent to England to learn English and he continued with his Grand Tour of Europe. He received tuition from respected goldsmiths in Germany, France and England, attended a course at Schloss's Commercial College in Paris, and viewed the objects in the galleries of Europe's leading museums. He was also apprenticed by the jeweler Josef Friedman of Frankfurt-am-Main, whose jewels were highly regarded in the German principalities. Fabergé returned to Saint Petersburg in 1864 and entered his father's firm. Although he was only 18 years of age, he continued his education and was tutored by Hiskias Pendin. He also developed friendships with members of the directorate of the Hermitage Museum and began unpaid work there in 1867.

== Career ==
=== Head of the family business ===
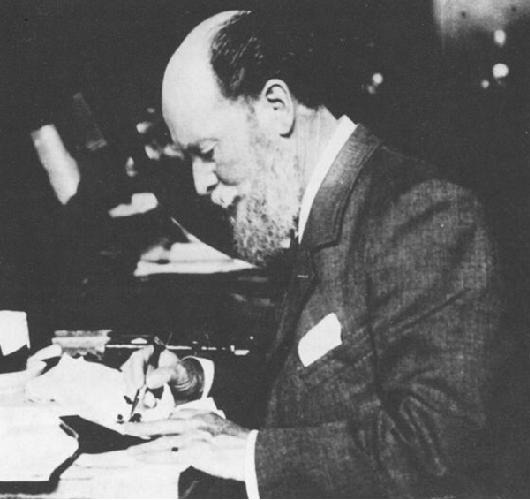
Peter Carl Fabergé at work c. 1900

On 20 November [O.S. 8 November] 1872, he married Augusta Julia Jacobs, daughter of the furniture craftsman Gotlieb Jacobs. He also took over his father's firm the same year. (Note: The year 1870 is also widely but erroneously quoted.) His first child, Eugène Fabergé, was born in 1874, and two years later, Agathon Fabergé was born; Alexander and Nicholas Fabergé followed in 1877 and 1884 respectively. The company was also involved with cataloguing, repairing, and restoring objects in the Hermitage during the 1870s. In 1881, the business moved to larger street-level premises at Bolshaya Morskaya. Fabergé also began making changes to transform the firm from what his son Eugène called "a dealer in petty jewelry and spectacles". His time in Europe had inspired him to make pieces that were more than a sum of their parts. As he later described in his own words: "Expensive things interest me little if the value is merely in so many diamonds or pearls".

By 1881, Carl earned enough recognition among his peers to be appointed "master of the Second Guild", which marked him as a merchant or retailer rather than a craftsman. This also meant he did not have to submit his pieces for official testing when using his own hallmark to that of the firm. Upon the death of Hiskias Pendin, Carl Fabergé took sole responsibility for running the company and was formally acknowledged as the head of the firm. At this time, the firm employed about 20 people.

The firm's first major breakthrough was in 1882, when Carl and Agathon Fabergé were a sensation at the Pan-Russian Exhibition of Industry and the Arts held in Moscow. Carl was awarded a gold medal. Due to his work at the Hermitage, which included Greek and Scythian jewelry from the 4th-century that he helped to restore, Fabergé had been invited to the exhibition; Fabergé had also received permission to copy and incorporate the designs of those articles, and this became the focus of his display. The magazine Niva wrote in an article: "Mr Fabergé opens a new era in the art of jewellery... Her Majesty honoured Fabergé by buying a pair of cufflinks with images of cicadas which, according to Ancient Greek belief, bring luck". Although he achieved recognition of the imperial family, Fabergé was only one of many jewellers supplying the Russian court; at least five firms are mentioned in the Imperial accounts for 1883, with only 6,400 rubles paid to Fabergé, which was by far the smallest.

Fabergé's production of the very first so-called Fabergé egg, the Hen Egg, given as a gift from Emperor Alexander III to his wife, Maria Feodorovna, on Orthodox Easter on 24 March 1885, so delighted her that on 1 May, the emperor patronized the firm and awarded it with the title of Supplier to the Imperial Court. This meant that Fabergé now had full personal access to the important Hermitage Collection, where he was able to study and find inspiration for developing his unique personal style. Influenced by the jewelled bouquets created by the eighteenth century goldsmiths Jean-Jacques Duval and Jérémie Pauzié, Fabergé re-worked their ideas combining them with his accurate observations and his fascination for Japanese art. This resulted in a revival of the lost art of enameling and a focus on the setting of every single gemstone in a piece to its best visual advantage. Indeed, it was not unusual for Agathon to make ten or more wax models so that all possibilities could be exhausted before deciding on a final design. Shortly after Agathon joined the firm, the House introduced objects deluxe: gold bejewelled items embellished with enamel ranging from electric bell pushes to cigarette cases and including objects de fantaisie.

=== Easter eggs ===
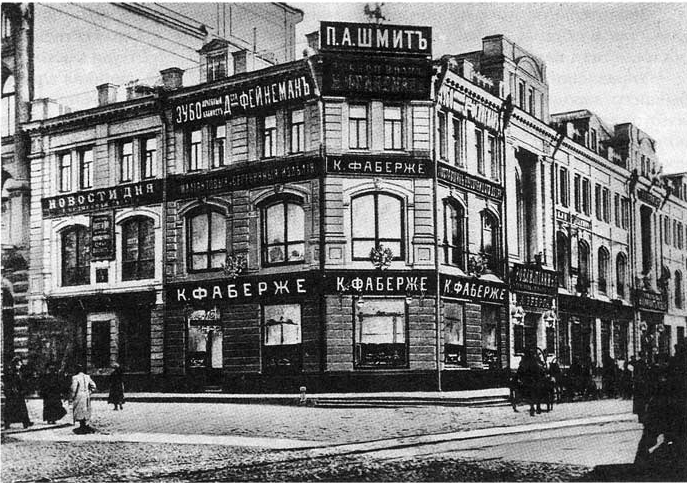
House of Fabergé in Moscow in Kuznetsky Most, 1893

In light of the empress' response to receiving one of Fabergé's eggs on Easter, the emperor soon commissioned the company to make an Easter egg as a gift for her every year thereafter. The emperor placed an order for another egg the following year. Beginning in 1887, the emperor apparently gave Carl Fabergé complete freedom with regard to egg designs, which then became more and more elaborate. According to Fabergé Family tradition, not even the emperor knew what form they would take— the only stipulation was that each one should be unique and each should contain a surprise. Alexander III collaborated with Fabergé on some of the designs to some extent.

Upon the 1894 death of Alexander III, his son, the next emperor, Nicholas II, followed this tradition and expanded it by requesting that there be two eggs each year, one for his mother (who was eventually given a total of 30 such eggs) and one for his wife, Alexandra (who received another 20). These series of Easter gift eggs are today distinguished from the other jeweled eggs Fabergé ended up producing by their designation as Imperial Easter Eggs. The tradition continued until the October Revolution when the entire Romanov dynasty was executed and the eggs and many other treasures were confiscated by the interim government. The two final eggs were never delivered nor paid for.

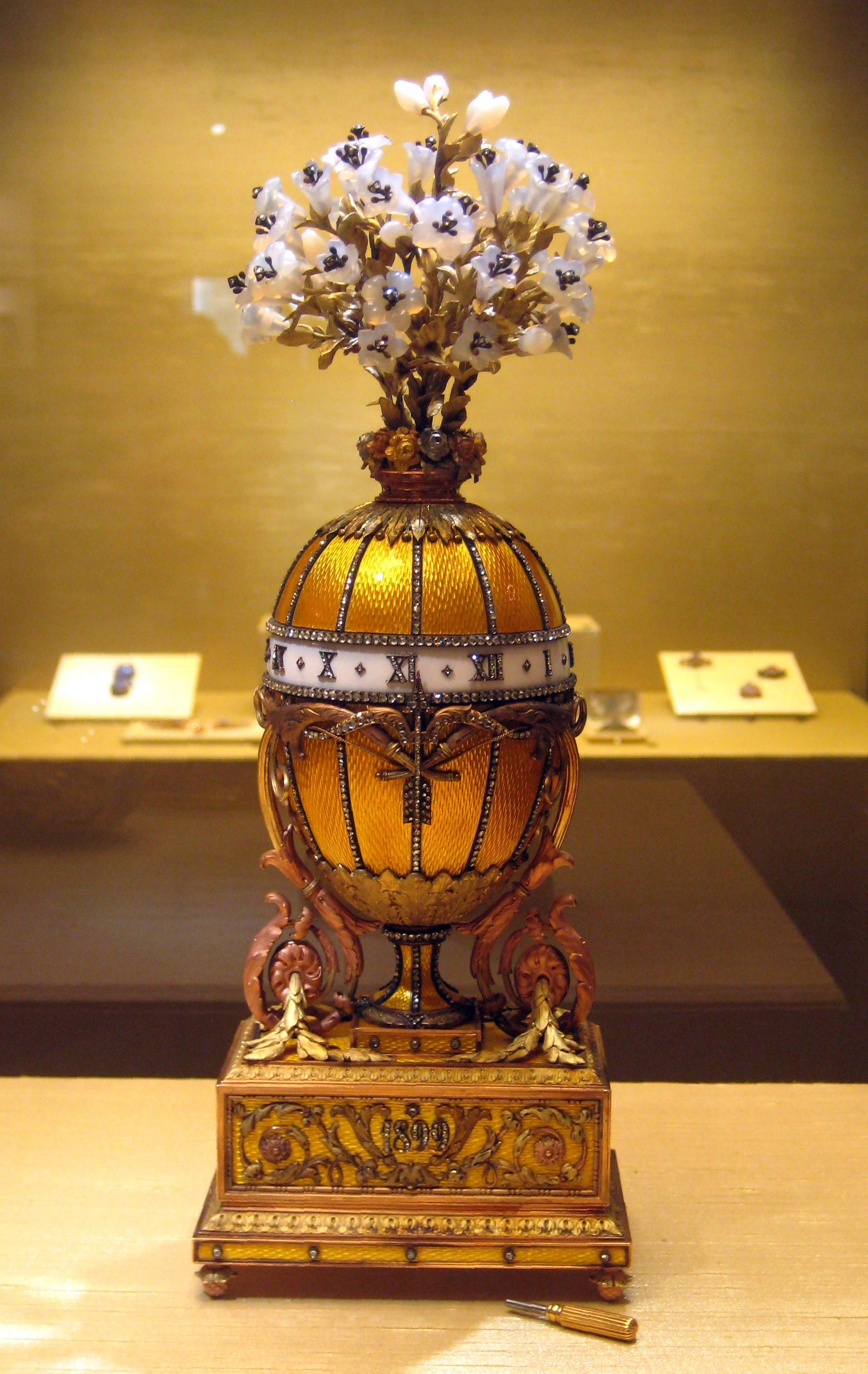
Bouquet of Lilies Clock, made in 1899 for Alexandra Feodorovna as a gift from Nicholas II.

Although today the House of Fabergé is famed for the Imperial Easter Eggs, it made many more objects ranging from silver tableware to fine jewelry which were also of exceptional quality and beauty, and until its departure from Russia during the revolution, Fabergé's company became the largest jewelry business in the country. The Saint Petersburg branch was made up of several workshops with the responsibility of overseeing each item from its design through all the manufacturing stages. The Moscow branch was run as a commercial center. Other branches were also established in Odessa (1890), London (1903) and Kiev (1905). A total of about 500 people worked for the firm. It produced at least 150,000 items of jewelry, silver and other items of fantasy, or up to an estimated 200,000 items from 1882 to 1917.

Fabergé's work represented Russia at the 1900 World's Fair in Paris. As Carl Fabergé was a member of the jury, the House of Fabergé exhibited hors concours (without competing). Nevertheless, the House was awarded a gold medal and the city's jewelers recognized Carl Fabergé as a maître. Additionally, France recognized Carl Fabergé with one of the most prestigious of French awards, appointing him a knight of the Legion of Honour. Two of Carl's sons and his head workmaster were also honored. Commercially, the exposition was a great success and the firm acquired a great many orders and clients.

=== End of the House of Fabergé ===
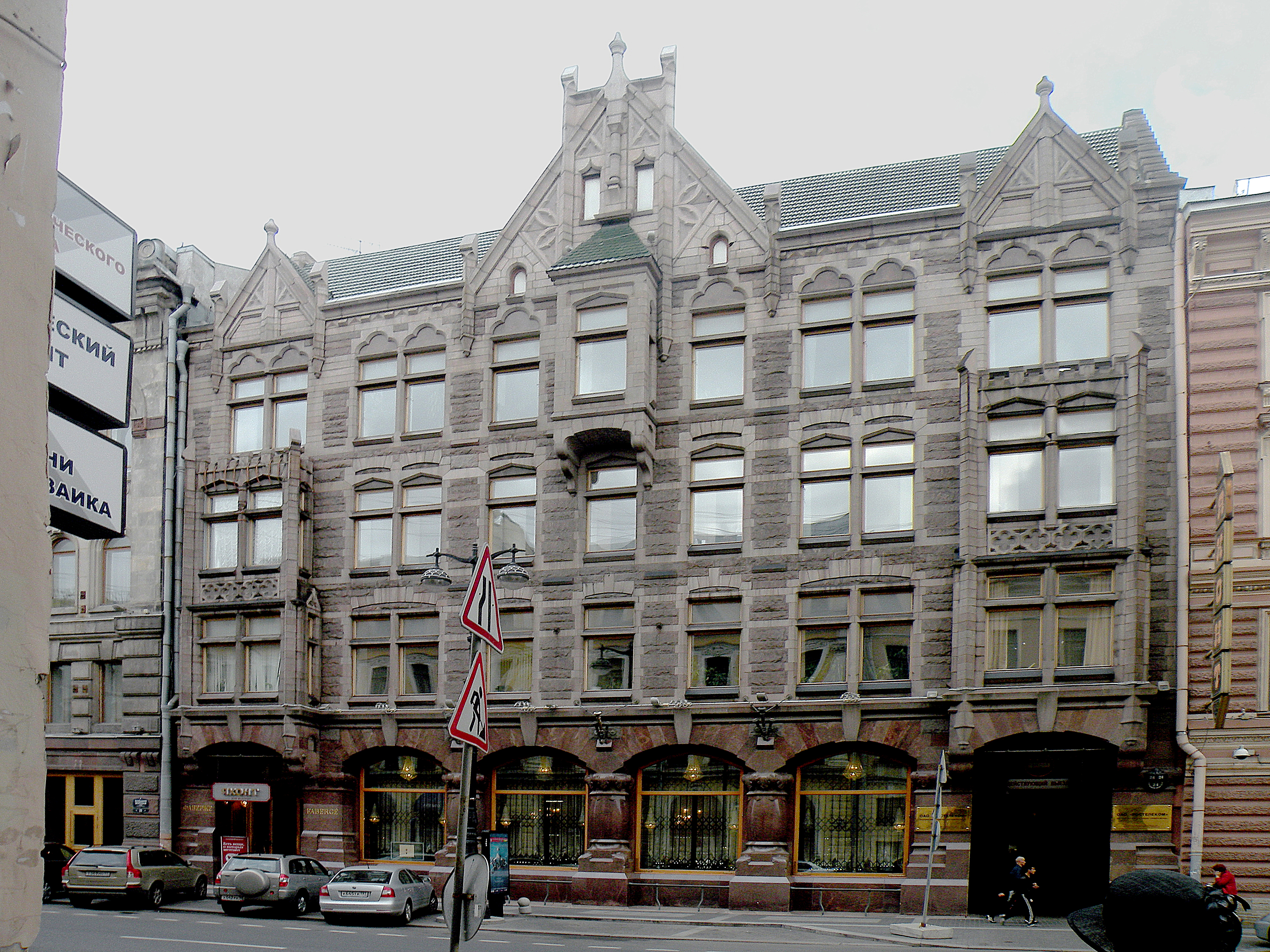
The main Fabergé store in Saint Petersburg was officially renamed Yakhont (Ruby) and still is known as the Fabergé store.

Following the outbreak of war in 1914, the firm submitted proposals for wartime production and received a response the following year, following which production began on military orders, which continued until the October Revolution in 1917. In 1916, the House of Fabergé became a joint-stock company under the name C. Fabergé, with a fixed capital of three million rubles.

As a result of the revolution, the business was run by a Committee of Employees, which managed the firm until 1918, when the workshops were closed by Fabergé, who then left the country after officials of the new government asked him to close the business. Fabergé reportedly asked for ten minutes to collect his belongings before leaving. The great majority of jewels were destroyed following the revolution.

Fabergé died at the Hotel Bellevue in Lausanne, Switzerland, on 24 September 1920. He had escaped Russia in September 1918 under disguise as a courier with the British legation. His family believed he died of a broken heart. His wife, Augusta, died in 1925. The two were reunited in 1929 when Eugène Fabergé took his father's remains from Lausanne and buried them in his mother's grave at the Cimetière du Grand Jas in Cannes, France.

== Personal life ==
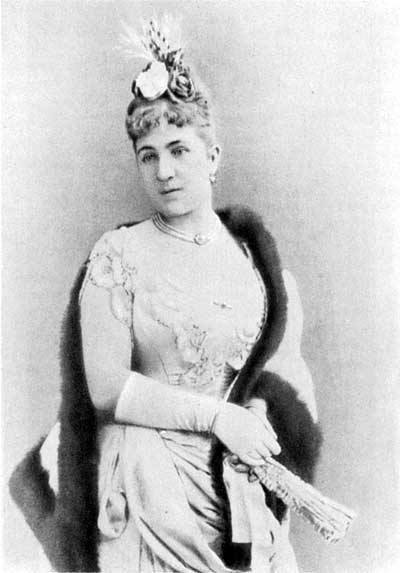
Augusta Julia Jacobs c. 1872

Henry Bainbridge, a manager of the London branch of the House of Fabergé, recorded recollections of his meetings with his employer in his autobiography, as well as the book he wrote about Fabergé. The autobiography also records the memories of François Birbaum, Fabergé's senior master craftsman from 1893 until the House's demise.

=== Family ===
Fabergé had five sons with Augusta Julia Jacobs, whom he married in 1872. Four of his sons lived to adulthood: Eugène (Evgeny) (1874–1960), Agathon (1876–1951), Alexander (1877–1952), and Nicholas (Nikolai) Leopold (1884–1939). Another son, Nikolai (1881–1883), died during infancy.

== Legacy ==
Bainbridge says that when Fabergé took over the firm in 1872, there was "no special significance attached it", although it was a sound business, but over time, he raised its art to a much higher level, with the foundation of the firm consisting of lightness and elegance in design as Fabergé began creating objects of fantasy in addition to jewelry.

== Bibliography ==
- Faber, Toby (2009). Faberge's Eggs: One Man's Masterpieces and the End of an Empire. Pan Macmillan. ISBN 978-0-330-44024-0.
- Fabergé, Tatiana; Proler, Lynekmkmtte G.; Skurlov, Valentin V. (1997). The Fabergé Imperial Easter Eggs. London. Christie's. ISBN 0-297-83565-3.
- Fabergé; Skurlov (1992). The History of the House of Fabergé according to the recollections of the senior master craftsman of the firm, Franz P. Birbaum. St Petersburg
- Bainbridge, Henry Charles (1979). Peter Carl Fabergé – Goldsmith and Jeweller to the Russian Imperial Court – His Life and Work. London. Batsfords – later reprints available such as New York, Crescent Books.
- Snowman, Kenneth (1964). The Art of Carl Fabergé. London. Faber & Faber. ISBN 0-571-05113-8.
- Snowman, A. Kenneth (2003). "Fabergé, (Peter) Carl (Gustavovitch)". Grove Art Online.
- von Habsburg, Geza (1987). Fabergé. Geneva. Habsburg. Feldman Editions. ISBN 0-571-15384-4.
- von Solodkoff, Alexander (1984). Masterpieces from the House of Fabergé. New York. Harry N Abrams. ISBN 0-8109-0933-2.
- von Habsburg, Géza (2004). Fabergé Treasures of Imperial Russia. Link of Times Foundation. ISBN 5-9900284-1-5.
- Faber, Toby (2008). Faberge's Eggs: The Extraordinary Story of the Masterpieces That Outlived an Empire. New York. Random House. ISBN 978-1-4000-6550-9.
- Hill, Gerald (2007). Faberge and the Russian Master Goldsmiths. New York. Universe. ISBN 978-0-7893-9970-0.
- Snowman, Kenneth (1988). Carl Fabergé: Goldsmith to the Imperial Court of Russia. Random House. ISBN 0-517-40502-4.
- Lowes, Will; McCanless, Christel Ludewig (2001). Fabergé Eggs: A Retrospective Encyclopedia. Scarecrow Press. pp. 196–198. ISBN 978-0-8108-3946-5.
