= Kelch Chanticleer (Fabergé egg) =

1904 Fabergé Kelch Egg

Kelch Chanticleer Fabergé egg
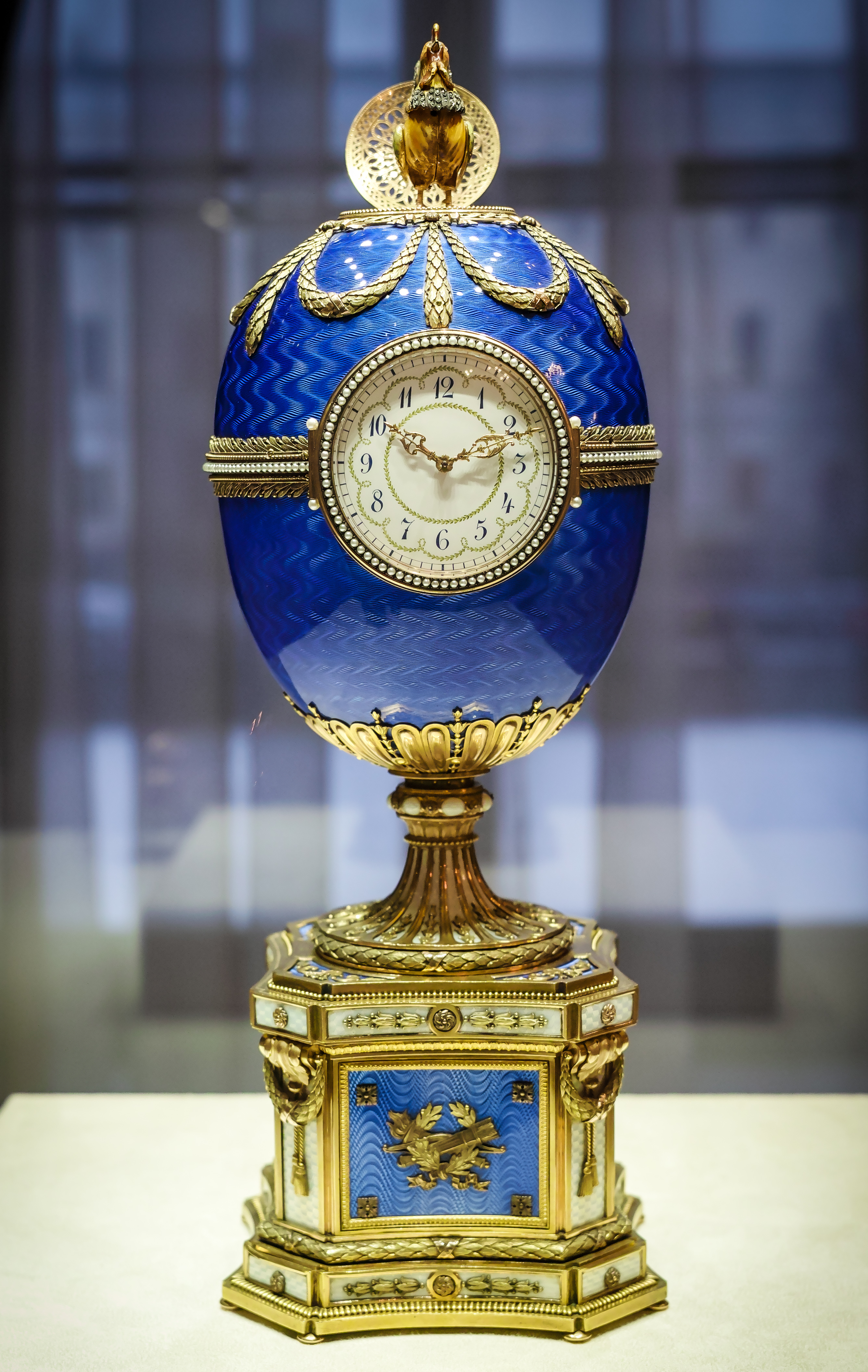
- Year delivered: 1904
- Customer: Alexander Kelch
- Recipient: Barbara Kelch-Bazanova

Current owner
- Individual or institution: Viktor Vekselberg; Fabergé Museum in Saint Petersburg, Russia
- Year of acquisition: 2004

Design and materials
- Workmaster: Michael Perchin
- Surprise: a diamond set cockerel pops up from the top of the egg

The Kelch Chanticleer egg is a jewelled, enameled Easter egg made by Michael Perchin under the supervision of the Russian jeweller Peter Carl Fabergé in 1904. It was made for the Russian industrialist Alexander Ferdinandovich Kelch, who presented the Fabergé egg to his wife, Barbara Kelch-Bazanova.

== Surprise ==
Upon the hour, a diamond set cockerel pops up from the top of the egg, flaps its wings four times, nods his head three times, crowing all the while during this routine. This lasts fifteen seconds, before the clock strikes the hour on a bell.

== Similarities with Rothschild egg ==
As one of only four eggs with an ornamentation surprise and a clock, similarities have been drawn with the 1902 Rothschild egg.

== History ==
The Kelch Chanticleer egg is, together with the 1906 Moscow Kremlin egg, one of Fabergé's largest Imperial Easter eggs. It was long believed to be an Imperial egg and was purchased as such from A La Vieille Russie by Malcolm Forbes in 1966.

The first doubts were raised as to its Imperial status in 1979, when the ownership of six Fabergé eggs illustrated in a 1920 photograph was attributed to Alexander Ferdinandovich Kelch. These included several eggs which had previously been considered Imperial (including the Pine Cone egg and the Chanticleer egg) as well as three others bearing the initials BK of Barbara Kelch (the 1898 Kelch Hen egg, the 1902 Rocaille egg and the 1903 Kelch Bonbonnière egg).

In 2004, it was sold as part of the Forbes Collection to Viktor Vekselberg. Vekselberg purchased some nine Imperial eggs from the collection, for almost $100 million. The egg is now housed in Vekselberg's Fabergé Museum in Saint Petersburg, Russia.

== See also ==
- Egg decorating
- Kinder Surprise
