= Pine Cone (Fabergé egg) =

1900 Fabergé Kelch Egg

Pine Cone Fabergé egg
- Year delivered: 1900
- Customer: Alexander Kelch
- Recipient: Barbara Kelch-Bazanova

Design and materials
- Workmaster: Michael Perkhin
- Materials used: gold; silver; jewels; enamel
- Surprise: an oxidized silver Indian elephant automaton

The Pine Cone egg is a jewelled enameled Easter egg made under the supervision of the Russian jeweller Peter Carl Fabergé in 1900. The Fabergé egg was made for Alexander Kelch, who presented it to his wife, Barbara (Varvara) Kelch-Bazanova.

== Design ==
The egg was created by workmaster Michael Perkhin (Russian, 1860–1903) and is crafted of gold, silver, rose-cut diamonds, brilliant diamonds and translucent royal blue enamel. The miniature elephant is made of silver, gold, ivory, rose-cut diamonds and red and green enamel. One end of the pine cone, a symbol of resurrection, is set with four petal-shaped portrait diamonds, forming a quatrefoil enclosing the date "1900". The opposite end is set with a rose-cut diamond star, enclosing a portrait diamond over a later miniature of a young woman. The Egg originally bore the monogram B.K.(for Barbara Kelch) beneath the portrait diamond, probably similar to that of the 1899 Kelch Twelve Panel egg. The egg shell opens to reveal, in a fitted velvet compartment, a surprise, an oxidized silver Indian elephant automaton with ivory tusks supporting an enameled turbaned mahout seated upon a gold fringed red and green guilloche enamel saddle cloth. Each side is set with three rose-cut diamond collets, one covering a keyhole. When wound with the original gold key, the tiny elephant lumbers forward, shifting its weight from one side to the other, all the while turning its head and flicking its tail. The egg has a height of 9.5 cm.

== Ownership ==
One of the six Kelch Eggs sold to Morgan in Paris by A La Vieille Russie. The Egg was sold in 1929 to a private United States collector. Sold in 1989 by Christie's Geneva to Joan Kroc (widow of Ray Kroc, former chairman of McDonald's) of San Diego, California for $3.1 million. Daniel Grossman, a New York art dealer, represented Joan Kroc at the sale and he stayed on the telephone with her throughout the bidding. Mrs. Kroc later told the New York Times "I was thrilled when I was told I had bought the egg." She had recently pledged $1 million to San Diego's 1989 three week arts festival "Treasures of the Soviet Union" and the Egg was the 26th Faberge egg at the festival. In 1997 the egg was offered by Christie's in New York in a sale which was headlined by the Fabergé-heavy collection of William Kazan, but did not sell with the highest bid of $2.8 million. The presale estimate was $3.5 to 4.5 million.

== See also ==
- Objet d'art
