= Apple Blossom =

Apple Blossom may refer to:

== Plants ==
- The flower of the apple tree (see Apple § Description)
- Apple blossom tree, a species of tree in the family Fabaceae
- A shrub cultivar of the genus Escallonia

== Other uses ==
- "Apple Blossom", 2000 song by the White Stripes
- Apple Blossoms, 1910 an operetta by Fritz Kreisler and Victor Jacobi
- Apple Blossoms, a painting by John Everett Millais, on display at the Lady Lever Art Gallery
- Apple Blossom Handicap, an Americanse race
- Apple Blossom Mall, Winchester, Virgin
- Apple Blossom (Fabergé egg)

== See also ==
- Apple Blossom Festival (disambiguation), several festivals with such name
