= Blue Serpent Clock (Fabergé egg) =

1895 Imperial Fabergé egg

Blue Serpent Clock Fabergé egg
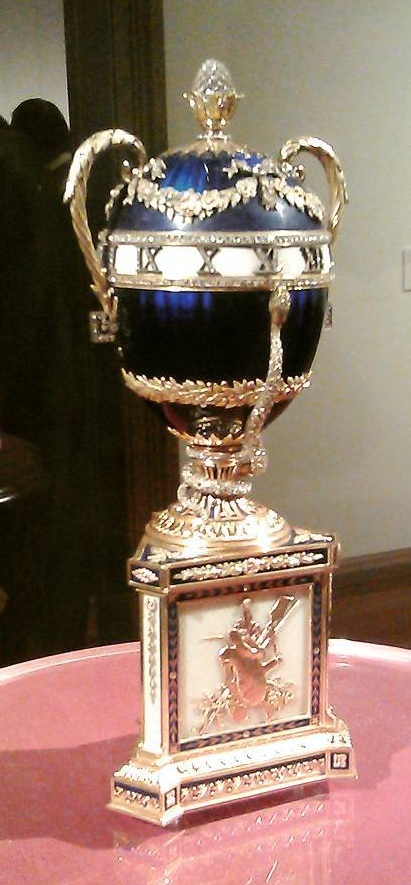
- The clock egg during an exhibition in Moscow in 2016, with the allegory of the countryside at the front of the base
- Year delivered: 1895
- Customer: Nicholas II
- Recipient: Maria Feodorovna

Current owner
- Individual or institution: Albert II, Prince of Monaco
- Year of acquisition: 2005, inherited from Rainier III

Design and materials
- Workmaster: Michael Perkhin
- Materials used: Gold, vitreous enamel, diamonds
- Height: 183 millimetres (7.2 in)
- Surprise: None (clock egg)

The Blue Serpent Clock egg is an Imperial Fabergé egg, one of a series of fifty-two jeweled eggs made under the supervision of Peter Carl Fabergé for the Russian Imperial Family. This egg features a clock and is a design that Fabergé repeated for the Duchess of Marlborough egg in 1902. Both pieces are based on the cercles tournants (revolving dial) urn clocks in the Louis XVI style with a snake to indicate the time. It is currently owned by Prince Albert II and is held in Monaco.

== Design ==
The crafting of this Imperial egg is credited to Michael Perkhin of Fabergé's shop. The egg stands on a three-sided base of gold, blue, and opalescent white guilloché enamel. The three panels of the base feature motifs of raised gold in four colors, each representing an allegory of the countryside, an allegory of astronomy and a basket of flowers, not the "arts and sciences", as stated in some monographs on Fabergé. This base has been rotated several times, so each of its three side panels has become the front one at some point. However, a 1902 archival photo, taken during a charity Fabergé exhibition held at the Baron von Dervis Mansion in Saint Petersburg, reveals that the allegory of astronomy was originally at the front of the base.

A serpent, set with diamonds, coils around the stand connecting the base to the egg and up toward its center. The serpent's head and tongue point to the hour, indicated in Roman numerals on a white band that runs around the egg near the top. This band rotates within the egg to indicate the time, rather than the serpent rotating around the egg. This is the first of the Tsar Imperial Fabergé eggs to feature a working clock.

The majority of the egg is enameled in translucent blue, and diamond-studded gold bands and designs ring the top and bottom of the egg. On each side of the egg a sculpted gold handle arches up in a "C" shape, attached to the egg on the top near the apex and on the lower half of the egg near the center.

== Surprise ==
The working clock is considered the egg's "surprise".

== History ==
It is not known when or how the Tsar ordered the Easter egg from Fabergé, but the Blue Serpent Clock Egg was presented to Maria Feodorovna by Tsar Nicholas II on Easter day, 1895. The egg was housed in the Anichkov Palace until the 1917 revolution, along with some other Fabergé eggs owned by Maria Feodorovna. The Serpent Clock Egg was transferred to the Armory Palace of the Kremlin in mid-September 1917. In 1922, the egg was likely transferred to the Sovnarkom, where it was held until it was sold abroad to Michel Norman of the Australian Pearl Company.

Between 1922 and 1950, the egg was bought by Emanuel Snowman of Wartski, sold, and bought back by Wartski. The egg was sold again by Wartski on Christmas Eve 1972 to Stavros Niarchos for £64,103. It was then given in 1974 to Prince Rainier III of Monaco to honor his Silver Jubilee. The Prince was unaware of its imperial provenance until it was lent to an exhibition. Following the death of Rainier III in 2005, it was inherited by his son, Prince Albert II.

Most Fabergé scholarship published prior to 2008 assigned the egg's creation to 1887, although with some notable reservations due to inconsistencies between the Blue Serpent Clock egg and contemporary descriptions of the 1887 egg. The Blue Serpent Clock Egg contains no sapphires. At the same time, descriptions for the 1887 egg from the Russian State Historical Archives, the 1917 inventory of confiscated imperial treasure and the 1922 transfer documents for the egg to be moved from the Anichkov Palace to the Sovnarkom, all describe an egg containing sapphires (the Third Imperial Egg recovered in 2012 contains sapphires and consistently fits the descriptions associated with the 1887 egg).

In 2008, Annemiek Wintraecken, an independent Fabergé egg researcher postulated the theory that the Blue Serpent Clock egg was Maria Feodorovna's Imperial Easter egg for 1895. The 2012 rediscovery of the 1887 Third Imperial Egg, announced to the world in March 2014, validated Wintraecken's theory.

== See also ==
- Objet d'art
- Egg decorating

== Sources ==
- Faber, Toby (2008). Faberge's Eggs: The Extraordinary Story of the Masterpieces That Outlived an Empire. Random House. ISBN 978-1-4000-6550-9.
- Forbes, Christopher; Prinz von Hohenzollern, Johann Georg (1990). FABERGE; The Imperial Eggs. Prestel. ASIN B000YA9GOM.
- Lowes, Will (2001). Fabergé Eggs: A Retrospective Encyclopedia. Scarecrow Press. ISBN 0-8108-3946-6.
- Snowman, A Kenneth (1988). Carl Faberge: Goldsmith to the Imperial Court of Russia. Gramercy. ISBN 0-517-40502-4.
