= Lilies of the Valley (Fabergé egg) =

1898 Imperial Fabergé egg

Lilies of the Valley Fabergé egg
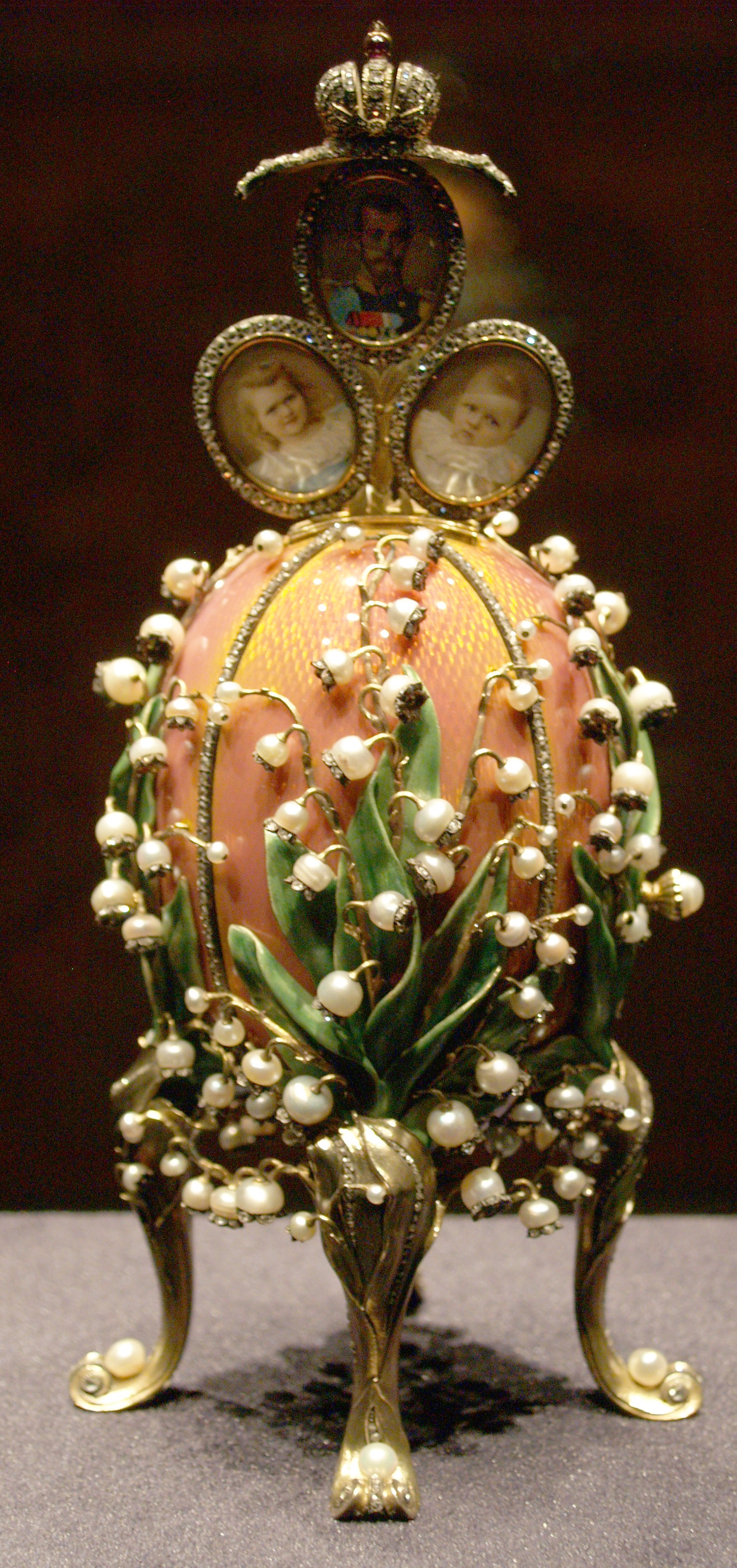
- Year delivered: 1898
- Customer: Nicholas II
- Recipient: Alexandra Fyodorovna

Current owner
- Individual or institution: Viktor Vekselberg; Fabergé Museum in Saint Petersburg, Russia
- Year of acquisition: 2004

Design and materials
- Workmaster: Michael Perkhin
- Materials used: Enamel, gold, diamonds, rubies, pearls
- Height: 151 millimetres (5.9 in) when closed, 199 millimetres (7.8 in) when opened
- Surprise: Portraits of Tsar Nicholas II and Grand Duchesses Olga and Tatiana

The Lilies of the Valley egg is a jewelled Fabergé egg made under the supervision of the Russian jeweller Peter Carl Fabergé in 1898 by Fabergé ateliers. The supervising goldsmith was Michael Perchin. The egg is one of the three eggs in the Art Nouveau style (the other two are the Pansy egg and the Clover Leaf egg). It was presented on April 5 to Tsar Nicholas II, who gave it as a gift to his wife, the Tsarina, Empress Alexandra Fyodorovna. The egg is part of the Victor Vekselberg Collection, owned by The Link of Times Foundation and housed in the Fabergé Museum in Saint Petersburg, Russia.

== Description ==
The egg is covered in pearls and topped with rose pink enamel on a guilloché field. The egg is supported by cabriole legs of green-gold leaves with rose-cut diamond dewdrops. The gold-stemmed lilies have green enameled leaves and flowers made of gold set with rubies, pearls, and diamonds.

== Surprise ==
This egg's surprise is 'elevated' out of the egg by twisting a gold-mounted pearl button. When fully raised, three portraits are visible under the Imperial crown set with a ruby: Tsar Nicholas II and his two oldest daughters, Grand Duchess Olga and Grand Duchess Tatiana, painted on ivory by Johannes Zehngraf. The portraits are framed in rose diamonds and backed with gold panels engraved with the presentation date of July 31, 1898.

== In popular culture ==
The Lilies of the Valley Fabergé egg is depicted in the British drama Peaky Blinders in Season 3.

== Sources ==
- Faber, Toby (2008). Faberge's Eggs: The Extraordinary Story of the Masterpieces That Outlived an Empire. Random House. ISBN 978-1-4000-6550-9.
- Forbes, Christopher; Prinz von Hohenzollern, Johann Georg (1990). FABERGE; The Imperial Eggs. Prestel. ASIN B000YA9GOM.
- Lowes, Will (2001). Fabergé Eggs: A Retrospective Encyclopedia. Scarecrow Press. ISBN 0-8108-3946-6.
- Snowman, A Kenneth (1988). Carl Faberge: Goldsmith to the Imperial Court of Russia. Gramercy. ISBN 0-517-40502-4.
