= Pansy (Fabergé egg) =

1899 Imperial Fabergé egg

Pansy Fabergé egg
- Year delivered: 1899
- Customer: Nicholas II
- Recipient: Dowager Empress Maria Feodoronova

Current owner
- Individual or institution: Unknown
- Year of acquisition: 1947

Design and materials
- Workmaster: Michael Perkhin
- Materials used: gold, silver-gilt, diamonds, pearls, enamel
- Height: 146 millimetres (5.7 in)
- Surprise: A heart containing family member portraits

The Pansy egg or Spinach Jade egg is one of the Imperial Russian Fabergé eggs, and it was commissioned in 1899 by Tsar Nicholas II as an Easter gift for his mother, Dowager Empress Maria Feodoronova. Its design was overseen by the jeweler Peter Carl Fabergé. This egg is one of only three made in the Art Nouveau style; the others are the Lilies of the Valley egg of 1898 and the Clover Leaf egg of 1902.

== Description ==
The egg is made of nephrite and has a stand made of gilt silver in the form of branches twisting up about the bottom of the egg (the egg points downward). Around the sides are five pansies with enamelled leaves and petals. The top of the egg – a nephrite dome – lifts off to reveal the egg's surprise.

== Surprise ==
Regarding the "surprise":

Within is a gold easel surmounted by a diamond-set Star of Bethlehem inside a wreath over the year; the easel is fluted and embellished with carved gold floral and torch motifs and is set with gems and pearls. On it rests a heart-shaped plaque enamelled opalescent white on a sun-ray guilloché background and bordered by rose diamonds set

in silver and surmounted by the Romanov crown also in diamonds. Eleven tiny translucent strawberry enamelled gold covers, each bearing its own monogram, are connected by a large diamond ‘M’ to form a decoration for the front of this plaque.

When a button is pressed, the covers open simultaneously revealing miniatures of the Imperial Family. Reading vertically, those in the first column are:

- Grand Duke George, the Tsar's younger brother and at this time heir apparent to the Imperial throne
- Grand Duke Alexander, the Tsar's brother-in-law via his sister, Grand Duchess Xenia

In the second column are

- the Tsar himself
- Grand Duchess Irina, subsequently Princess Youssoupoff, the Tsar's only niece, daughter of Grand Duke Alexander and Grand Duchess Xenia

In the third column are:

- Grand Duchess Olga Nikolaevna, the first child of the Tsar and Tsarina
- Grand Duchess Tatiana, their second child
- Grand Duke Michael, youngest brother of the Tsar

In the fourth column are

- The Tsarina, Empress Alexandra Feodorovna
- Grand Duke Andrew, the Tsar's nephew, brother of Grand Duchess Irina

In the fifth column are:

- Grand Duchesses Olga Alexandrovna, sister of the Tsar
- Grand Duchess Xenia, the other sister of the Tsar.

Not shown are the Tsar's three other as-yet-unborn children.

== Owners ==
This egg is among the 10 Fabergé eggs sold by the Russian Antikvariat in 1930, and it was purchased by the Hammer Galleries of New York. The gallery's owner, Armand Hammer, then sold it to the New Orleans oil heiress Matilda Geddings Gray in 1947. She in turn gave it to her niece, Matilda Gray Stream (Mrs. Harold H. Stream, Jr.), as a wedding anniversary present. It is one of the very few Fabergé Imperial Easter eggs to remain in a private collection.
