= Rocaille (Fabergé egg) =

1902 Fabergé Kelch Egg

Rocaille Fabergé egg
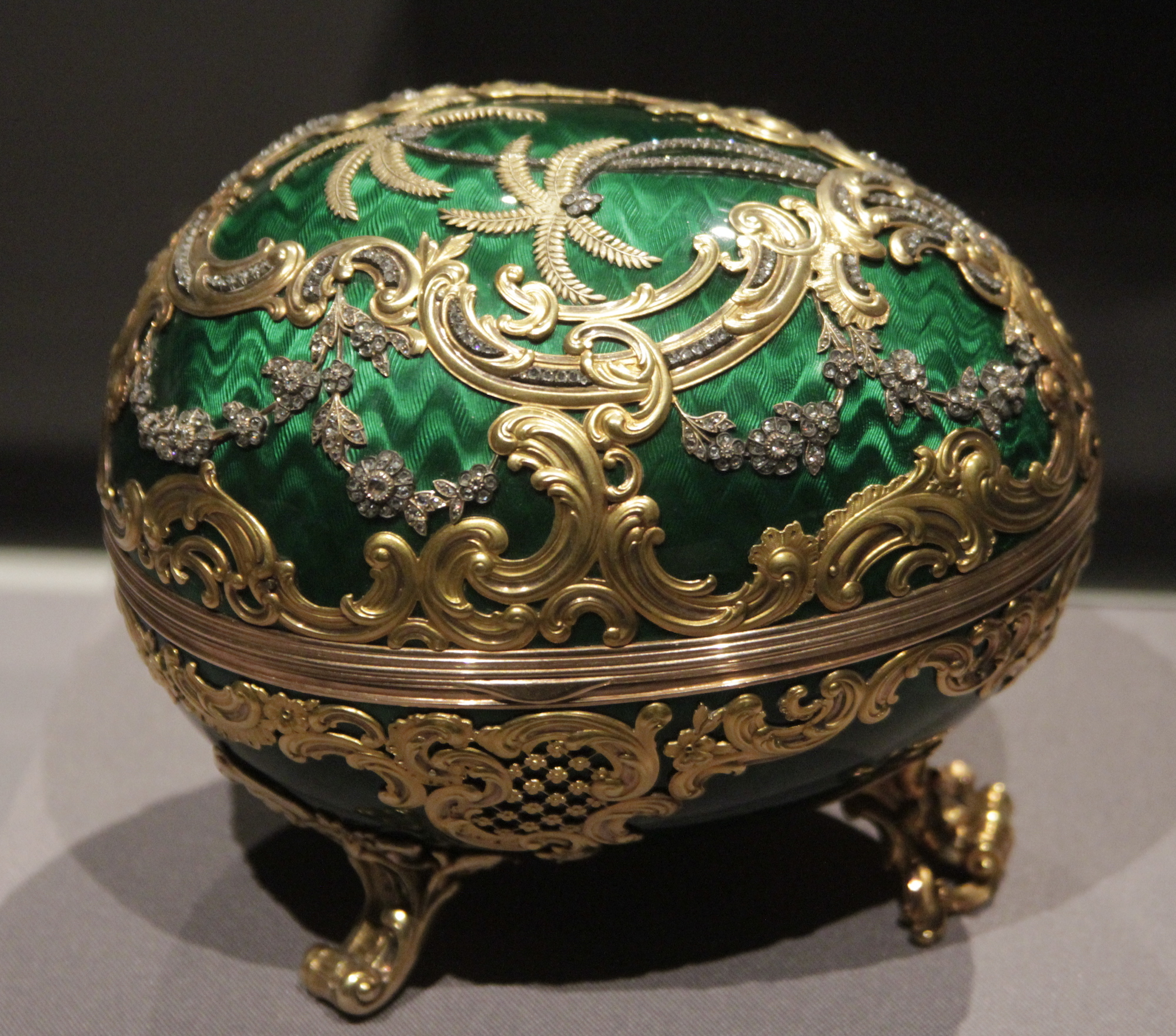
- Year delivered: 1902
- Customer: Alexander Kelch
- Recipient: Barbara Kelch-Bazanova

Current owner
- Individual or institution: Artie and Dorothy McFerrin
- Year of acquisition: 2012

Design and materials
- Workmaster: Mikhail Evlampievich Perkhin
- Materials used: platinum, diamonds, transparent green enamel, and silk
- Height: 120 millimetres (4.7 in)
- Width: 142 millimetres (5.6 in)
- Surprise: Gold tripod with enameled heart holding three portraits

The Rocaille egg is one of the Fabergé eggs created in the workshop of Peter Carl Fabergé for the wealthy Russian industrialist Alexander Kelch who presented it to his wife as an Easter gift in 1902. Because it was not a gift from a Russian tsar to his tsarina, it is not considered an "imperial" Fabergé egg but rather, in this instance, is called one of the seven "Kelch" eggs. It is the fifth egg in this series.

== Surprise ==
Like every Easter egg Fabergé produced, this one has a "surprise" within it. In this case, it is a gold tripod surmounted by a translucent enameled rose-colored engraved heart with the initials "B.K." (Barbara Kelch) set with diamonds on one side and the year, "1902" also set with diamonds on the other. Inside, the heart has spaces for three images (most likely tiny paintings). The miniatures originally contained in the three frames are now missing.

== History ==
The egg was sold by Kelch in 1920 following the Russian Revolution and was purchased by a Mr. Leon Ginberg that same year after being offered for sale by the French jeweller Morgan on the Rue de la Paix in Paris. Because of French regulations with regard to hallmarking, this egg (and several others being offered up) could not be exhibited. In the 1940s it was sold by A La Vieille Russie in New York, and between 1949 and 1958 it was owned by Jack and Belle Linsky of New York. Then in 1958 it was bought by A La Vieille Russie once again. Between 1962 and 1997 it was held in a private collection Finland. Then in 1997 it was sold by a dealer named Proler of Dallas, Texas to an undisclosed private individual. In 2012 it was purchased through London based Fabergé broker, Matthew Stuart-Lyon, by Artie and Dorothy McFerrin for their collection. In 2013 it was exhibited in Houston, Texas as part of a Fabergé Symposium.

== See also ==
- Objet d'art
