= Duchess of Marlborough (Fabergé egg) =

1902 Fabergé egg

Duchess of Marlborough Fabergé egg
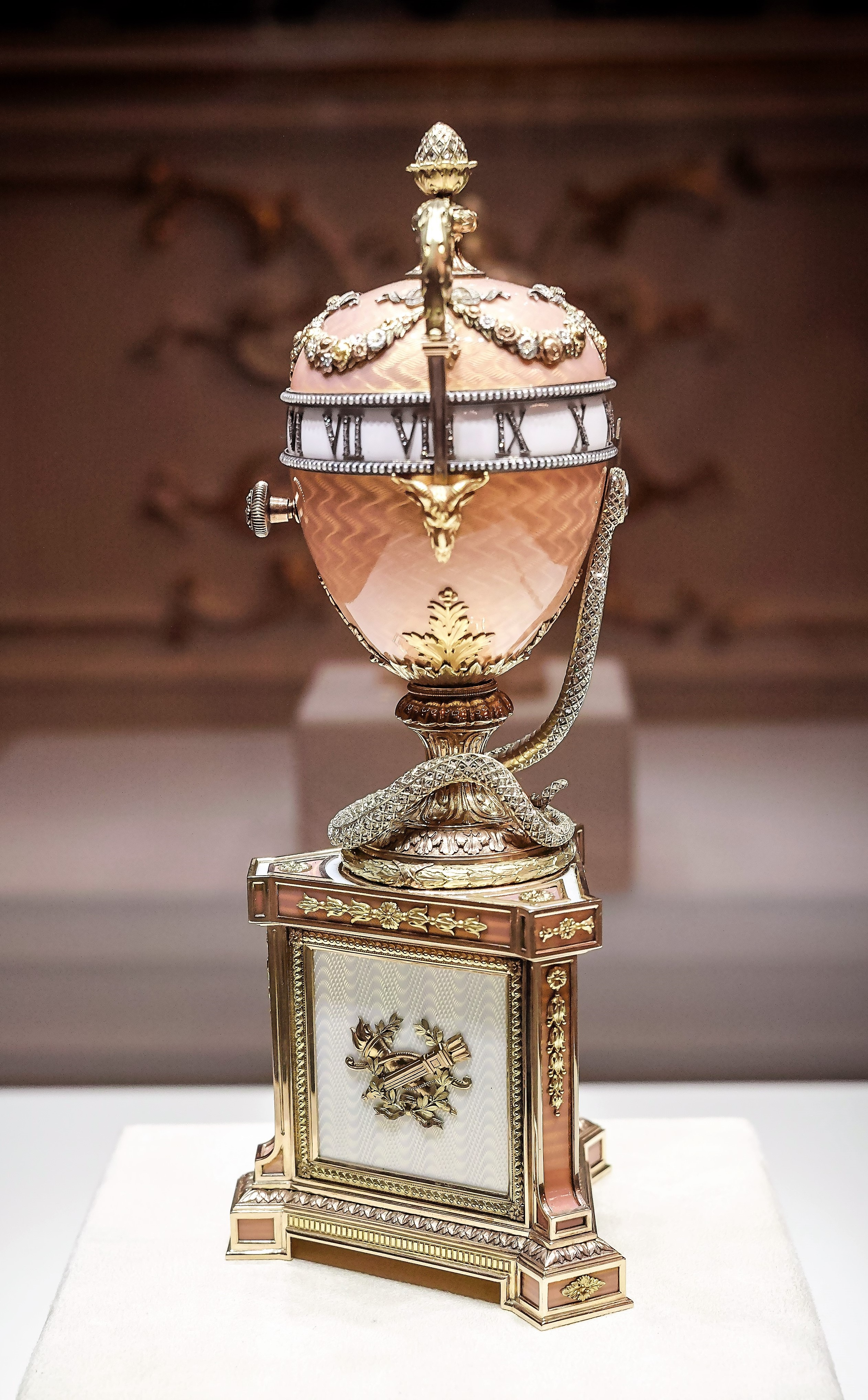
- Side view of the egg
- Year delivered: 1902
- Customer: Consuelo, Duchess of Marlborough
- Recipient: Consuelo, Duchess of Marlborough

Current owner
- Individual or institution: Viktor Vekselberg; Fabergé Museum in Saint Petersburg, Russia
- Year of acquisition: 2004

Design and materials
- Workmaster: Michael Perchin
- Height: 235 millimetres (9.3 in)
- Surprise: none (clock egg)

The Duchess of Marlborough egg, also known as the Pink Serpent egg, is a jewelled enameled Easter egg made by Michael Perchin under the supervision of the renowned Russian jeweller Peter Carl Fabergé in 1902.

The Duchess of Marlborough Egg is the only large Fabergé egg to have been commissioned by an American, and it is inspired by the cercles tournants (revolving dial) urn clocks in the Louis XVI style with a snake to indicate the time. It is similar to the earlier imperial Blue Serpent Clock egg.

== History ==
The egg was made for Consuelo Vanderbilt, who later became the Duchess of Marlborough in 1895 when she married Charles Spencer-Churchill, 9th Duke of Marlborough.

In 1902, the Duchess and her husband travelled to Russia, where they dined with Tsar Nicholas II of Russia and visited his mother, the Dowager Empress Maria Feodorovna at the Anichkov Palace. During this visit, the Duchess would have almost certainly seen the Dowager Empress' large collection of Fabergé items, which perhaps inspired her to order this egg. The egg is believed to have cost over 5,000 rubles.

After her divorce from the Duke of Marlborough, she donated the Duchess of Marlborough Egg to a charity auction in 1926. The egg was bought by Ganna Walska, the second wife of Harold Fowler McCormick, chairman of the International Harvester Company of Chicago. At the 1965 Parke-Bernet auction of her property, it was bought by Malcolm Forbes. It was the first of several Fabergé eggs that Forbes purchased.

In 2004, it was sold as part of the Forbes Collection to Viktor Vekselberg. Vekselberg also purchased nine Imperial Easter eggs, as part of the collection, for approximately $100 million. The egg is now housed in Vekselberg's Fabergé Museum in Saint Petersburg, Russia.

== See also ==
- Objet d'art
