= Twelve Panel (Fabergé egg) =

1899 Fabergé Kelch Egg

Twelve Panel Fabergé egg
- Year delivered: 1899
- Customer: Alexander Kelch
- Recipient: Barbara Kelch-Bazanova

Current owner
- Individual or institution: Charles III
- Year of acquisition: 2022, inherited from Elizabeth II

Design and materials
- Workmaster: Michael Perkhin
- Materials used: Gold, enamel, diamond
- Surprise: lost

The Twelve Panel is a jewelled enameled Easter egg made under the supervision of the Russian jeweller Peter Carl Fabergé in 1899. The Fabergé egg was made for Alexander Kelch, who presented it to his wife, Barbara (Varvara) Kelch-Bazanova.

== Description ==
The egg was created by Peter Carl Faberge's workmaster, Michael Perkhin (Russian, 1860–1903) and is crafted of yellow gold, rose-cut diamonds, portrait diamonds, translucent pink en green enamel and opaque white enamel. The upper and lower sections of the Egg are each divided into six panels by bands of matte-finished gold, overlaid with rows of pink enamel roses with gold stems and translucent green leaves. A band of rose-cut diamonds set at intervals with rosettes of additional diamonds encircles the Egg at its widest part. Each end of the Egg is finished with concentric circles of diamonds, gold and green enameled leaf motifs and pink enamel. the top end is centered with a medallion bearing the initials B.T.K. in script under a portrait diamond.; the other end has a similar, though smaller medallion showing the date "1899". The surprise has been lost.

== Ownership ==
This is the only Kelch Egg that was not part of the lot bought by the Paris jeweller Morgan. The Egg was purchased sometime in the 1920s and bought by A La Vieille Russie in Paris, likely from Barbara Kelch. In 1933 sold by A La Vieille Russie, Paris. Presented at Christmas 1933 by King George V of the United Kingdom as a gift for his wife Queen Mary of Teck, and remains a part of the Royal Collection of King Charles III. Other Fabergé Eggs in the Royal Collection include:

1. Basket of Wild Flowers, 1901, Gift of Nicholas II to Empress Alexandra Feodorovna.
2. Colonnade, 1910, Gift of Nicholas II to Empress Alexandra Feodorovna.
3. Mosaic, Gift of Nicholas II to Empress Alexandra Feodorovna.

== See also ==
- Objet d'art
