= Alexander Kelch =

Russian noble

Alexander Ferdinandovich Kelch was a Russian nobleman who lived in St Petersburg at the end of the 19th century. He is remembered mainly as a patron of Fabergé, having commissioned the Kelch Gothic Revival silver service and seven eggs (Note: Hen (1898), Twelve Panel (1899), Pine Cone (1900), Apple Blossom (1901), Rocaille (1902), Bonbonnière (1903), and Chanticleer (1904).) for his wife Barbara (Varvara).

His wealth came from marrying his brother's widow Varvara Petrovna Bazanova, whose family had made a fortune in Siberian industry, particularly gold-mining. The Bazanov business empire collapsed after the Russo-Japanese War; the couple divorced in 1915, Varvara moving to Paris and Alexander remaining as a pauper in Russia; he was arrested and disappeared in Siberia in 1930.
