= Matilda Geddings Gray =

American philanthropist and art collector (1885–1971)

- Portrait of Matilda Geddings Gray in 1926 by Helen Turner
- Born: March 18, 1885; Lake Charles, Louisiana, U.S.
- Died: February 26, 1971 (aged 85); Lake Charles, Louisiana, U.S.

Matilda Geddings Gray (March 18, 1885 – February 26, 1971) was an American heiress, businesswoman, art collector, and philanthropist.

== Life ==
She was one of three children born to wealthy oilman John Geddings Gray of Lake Charles. Her siblings were brothers Henry and Bill. Upon her father's death, she became heir to his fortune and took over the family oil and timber businesses. With a passion for historic preservation, in 1938 she restored the John Gauche House in the New Orleans French Quarter. The Evergreen Plantation, now a U.S. National Historic Landmark, was one of her projects.

She preferred her philanthropic deeds be low-key, so as not to put her in the spotlight. Among those deeds was an international act of generosity to the nations of France and England to help them cope with post-World War II food shortages. During this time, she shipped over 250,000 pounds of rice to those countries.

Gray collected Fabergé objects, including the Fabergé eggs Napoleonic, Danish Palaces, Caucasus, and Pansy. After her death, her collection of Fabergé eggs was put on display by the New Orleans Museum of Art.

In 1935, she traveled to Guatemala where she collected traditional textiles and documented clothing.

== Awards and honors ==
Her philanthropic endeavors earned her the following international honors:

- Order of the British Empire
- Order of the Quetzal (Guatemala)
- Legion of Honour (France)

== Legacy ==
In 1971 The Matilda Geddings Gray Foundation was established in Lake Charles, Louisiana. Its Matilda Geddings Gray Foundation Collection is on long-term loan at The Metropolitan Museum of Art.
