= Caucasus (Fabergé egg) =

1893 Imperial Fabergé egg

Caucasus Fabergé egg
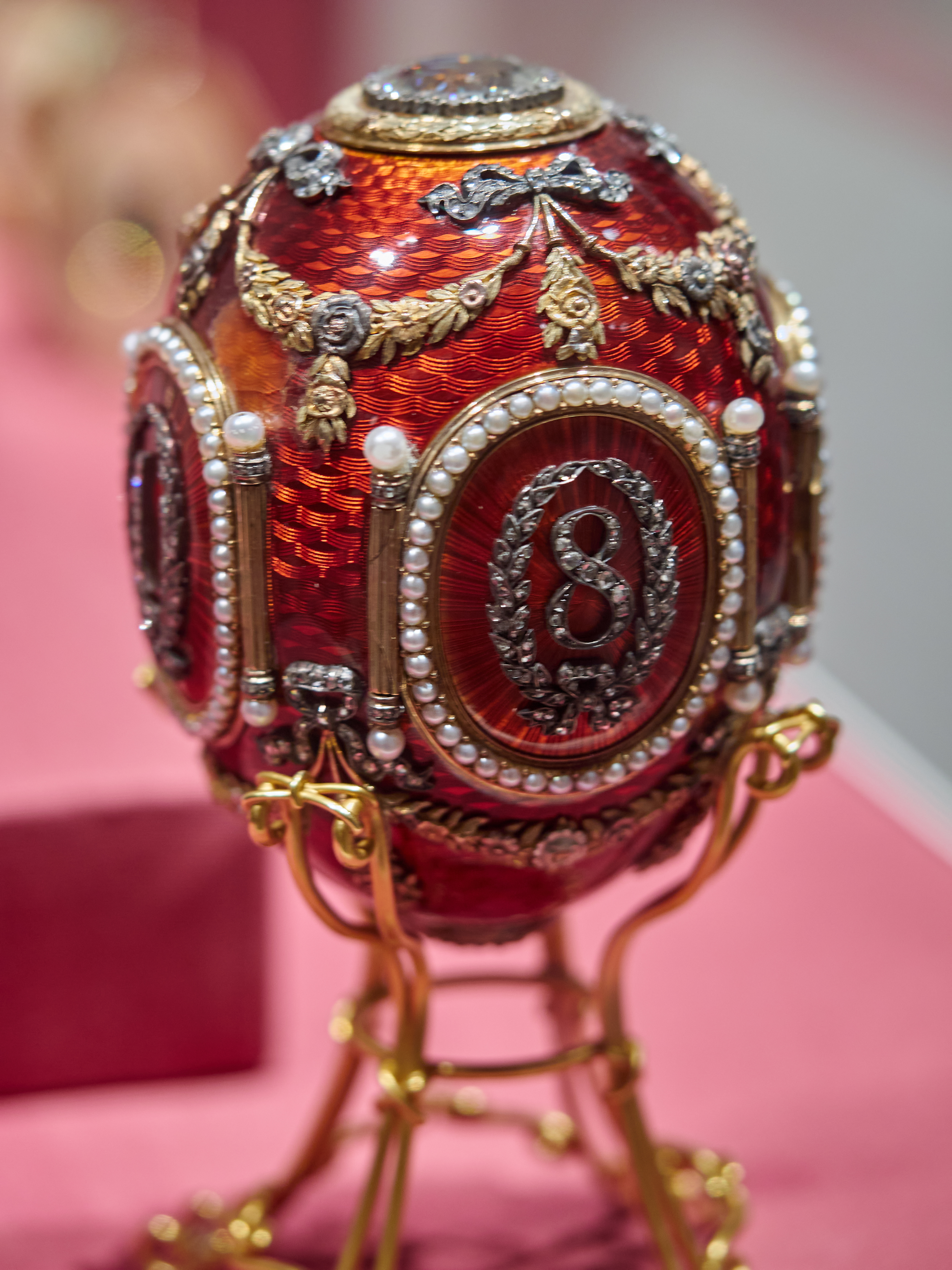
- Year delivered: 1893
- Customer: Alexander III
- Recipient: Maria Feodorovna

Current owner
- Individual or institution: Matilda Geddings Gray Foundation

Design and materials
- Workmaster: Michael Perkhin
- Materials used: Gold, silver, enamel, diamond, platinum, pearls, rock crystal, watercolour on ivory
- Surprise: Miniature paintings

The Caucasus Egg is a jewelled enameled Easter egg made by Michael Perkhin under the supervision of the Russian jeweller Peter Carl Fabergé in 1893. The Fabergé egg was made for Alexander III of Russia, who presented it to his wife, Empress Maria Feodorovna.

Currently the egg is a long term installation at the Metropolitan Museum of Art in New York City, New York, as part of the Matilda Geddings Gray Foundation.

== Design ==
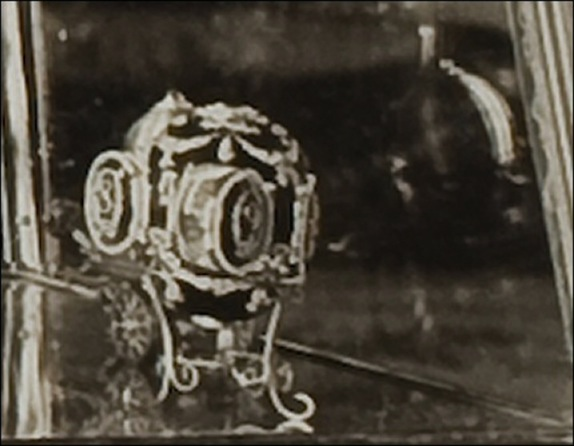
The egg in 1902 with its original matching stand, now lost.

The egg is made of yellow and varicoloured gold, silver, ruby enamel, rose-cut diamonds, portrait diamonds, platinum, ivory, pearls, rock crystal and watercolour on ivory.

It commemorates Abastumani in Caucasus (Georgia) where Grand Duke George spent most of his life after being diagnosed with tuberculosis. Miniatures were done and signed by Krijitski. The miniatures are revealed by opening four pearl-bordered doors around the egg. Each door bears a diamond-set numeral of the year, forming the year 1893. Behind the hinged cover at the top is a portrait of the Grand Duke in his naval uniform.

This is the first Imperial egg known to be dated. Ruby red enamel was used only one other time for the Imperial eggs.

== Surprise ==
The surprise for this egg are the miniature paintings themselves.

== See also ==
- Egg decorating

== Sources ==
- Faber, Toby (2008). Faberge's Eggs: The Extraordinary Story of the Masterpieces That Outlived an Empire. Random House. ISBN 978-1-4000-6550-9.
- Forbes, Christopher; Prinz von Hohenzollern, Johann Georg (1990). FABERGE; The Imperial Eggs. Prestel. ASIN B000YA9GOM.
- Lowes, Will (2001). Fabergé Eggs: A Retrospective Encyclopedia. Scarecrow Press. ISBN 0-8108-3946-6.
- Snowman, A Kenneth (1988). Carl Faberge: Goldsmith to the Imperial Court of Russia. Gramercy. ISBN 0-517-40502-4.
