= Danish Palaces (Fabergé egg) =

1890 Imperial Fabergé egg

Danish Palaces Fabergé egg
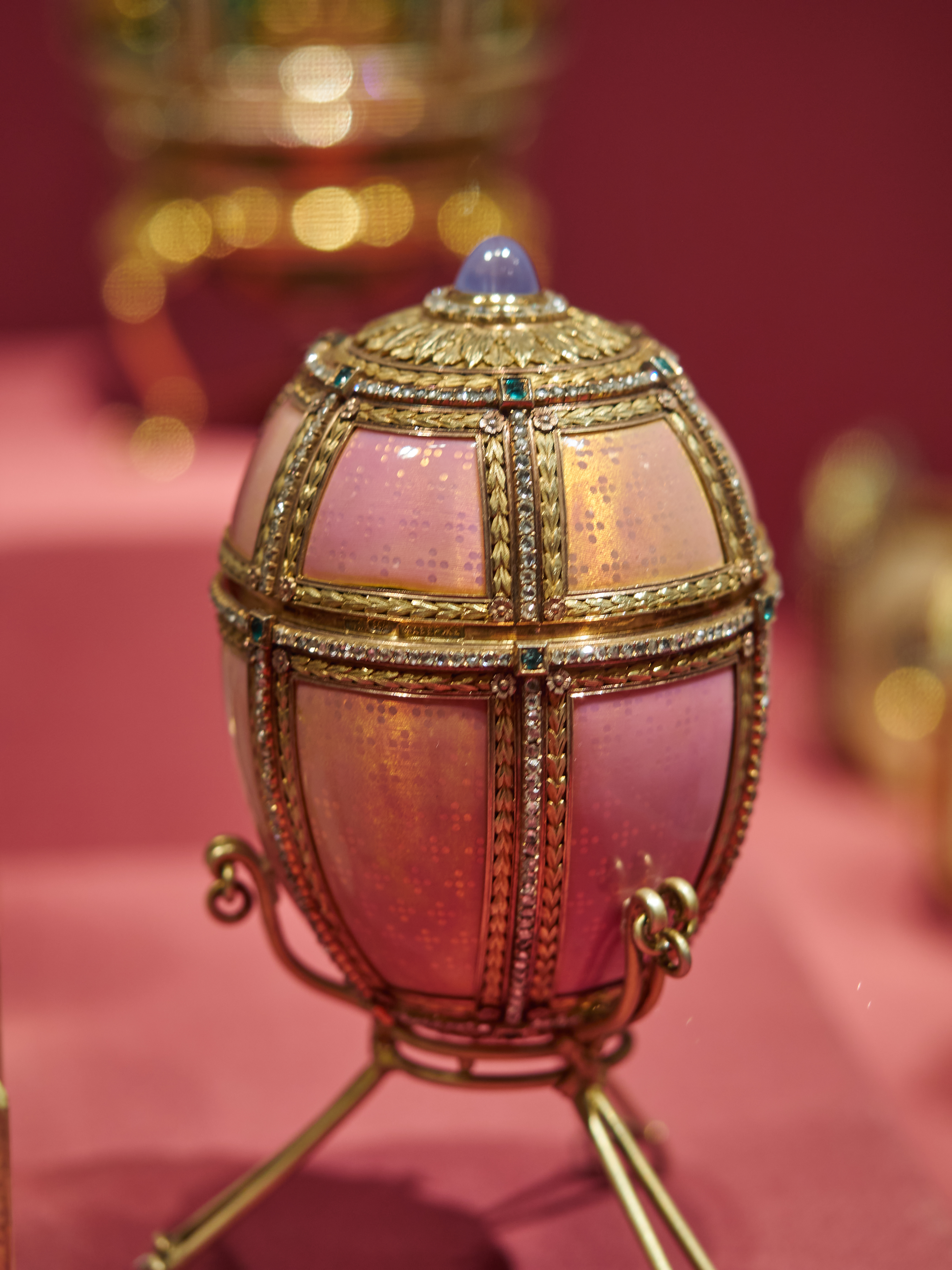
- Year delivered: 1890
- Customer: Alexander III
- Recipient: Maria Feodorovna

Current owner
- Individual or institution: Matilda Geddings Gray Foundation, housed in the Metropolitan Museum of Art in New York City, New York.
- Year of acquisition: 1972

Design and materials
- Workmaster: Michael Perkhin, miniatures by Konstantin Krijitski
- Materials used: Multi-colored gold, pink-mauve enamel, star sapphire, emeralds, diamonds, crimson velvet lining. Screen is multi-colored gold and watercolor on mother of pearl
- Height: 102 millimetres (4.0 in)
- Width: 67 millimetres (2.6 in)
- Surprise: 10-panel screen with watercolor paintings of Danish palaces and imperial yachts

The Danish Palaces egg is an Imperial Fabergé egg, one of a series of fifty-two jeweled eggs made under the supervision of Peter Carl Fabergé for the Russian Imperial family. It was crafted and delivered to the then Tsar of Russia, Alexander III who presented it to his wife, Maria Feodorovna on Easter day 1890. The egg is currently owned by the Matilda Geddings Gray Foundation and housed in the Metropolitan Museum of Art in New York City.

== Design of the egg ==
The exterior of this egg is pink-mauve enameled gold split into twelve sections. It measures 102 mm (4 in.) tall by 67 mm (2 5/8 in.) wide. Six vertical lines of rose-cut diamonds and three horizontal lines separate the enameled panels from one another. There is an emerald at each intersection of the lines separating the panels, and the egg is crowned with a medallion of radiating leaves around a cabochon star sapphire. The opposite end of the egg is chased with additional acanthus leaves.

== Surprise ==
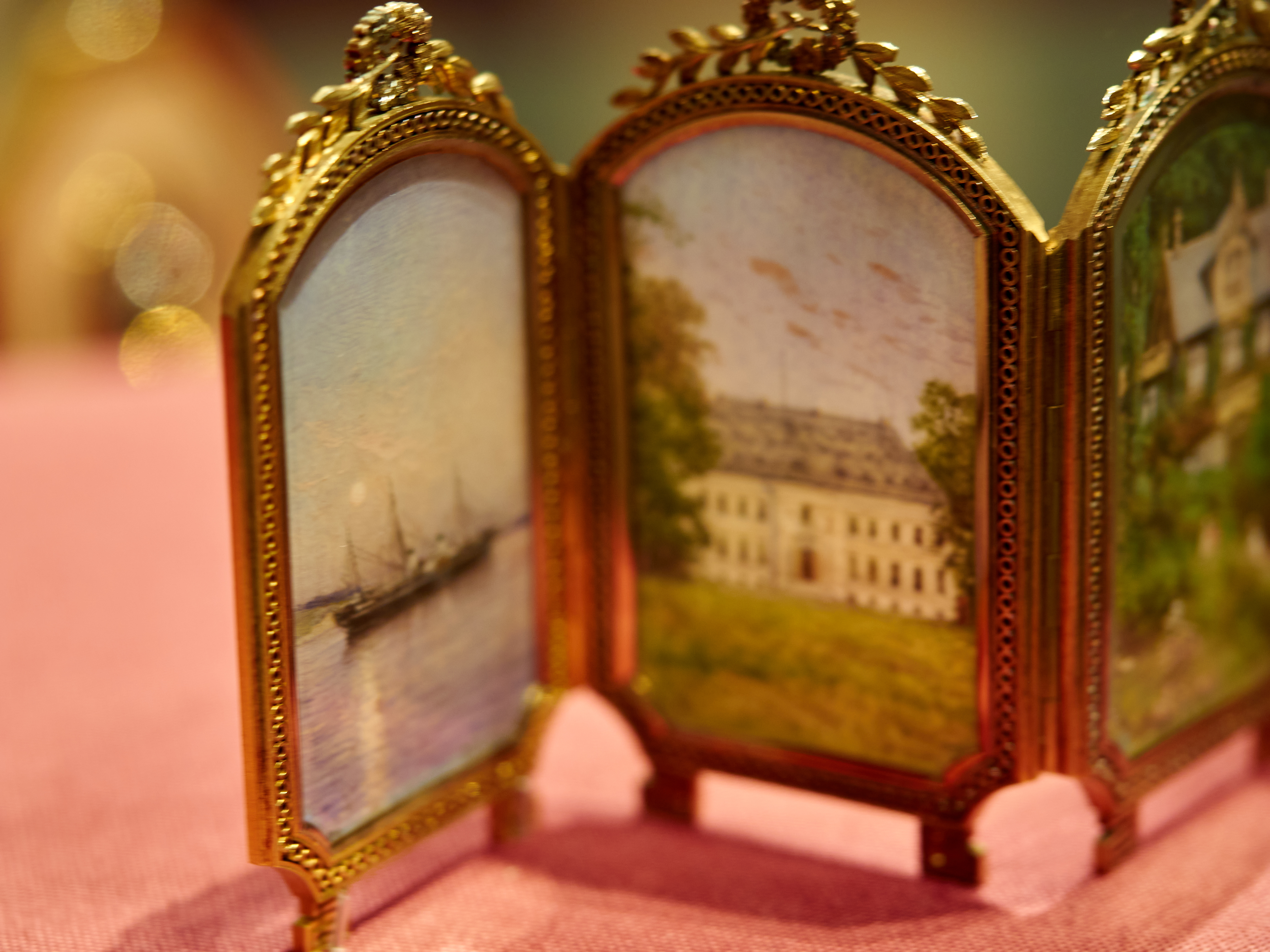
Partial view of the surprise. Visibles are the panels depicting the yacht Polar Star, Bernstorff Palace and part of Kejserens Villa in Fredensborg estate.

The egg opens to reveal a 10-panel screen made of multi-color gold with watercolors on mother of pearl. The panels are framed with a design of tangent circles with a multi-color gold wreath at the apex and stand on Greek meander feet. The watercolors are all signed by Konstantin Krijitski and dated 1889. The paintings depict, from left to right along the screen, the imperial yacht Polar Star; Bernstorff Palace, Copenhagen; Kejserens Villa, the emperor's villa in Fredensborg park, near Fredensborg Castle; Amalienborg Palace, Copenhagen; Kronborg Castle, Helsingør; the Cottage Palace, Peterhof; Gatchina Palace near St. Petersburg and the imperial yacht Tsarevna.

== History of egg ==
Alexander III received the Danish Palaces Egg from Fabergé's shop on March 30, 1890 and presented the egg to his wife, Maria Feodorovna on April 1. The Tsar paid 4,260 silver rubles for the egg. In January 1893 the egg was housed at the Gatchina Palace and remained there until the 1917 revolution. In 1917 it was transferred with the rest of the imperial eggs sent to the Armory Palace of the Kremlin. During the early part of 1922 the egg was transferred to the Sovnarkom, then moved back to the Armory Palace in the summer of 1927. The Danish Palaces Egg was selected along with 11 others for sale outside of Russia in April 1930, and was sold to Hammer Galleries later that year for 1500 rubles. Hammer Galleries advertised the egg for sale in 1935 for $25,000 and was sold between February 1936 and November 1937 to Nicholas H. Ludwig of New York. The egg was owned by a private collector during the time between 1962 and 1971, when it was found in the collection of deceased Matilda Geddings Gray. Since 1972 the egg has been the provenance of the Matilda Geddings Gray Foundation, and is currently on display in the Metropolitan Museum of Art in New York City.

== See also ==
- Egg decorating
