= Kelch Gothic Revival silver service =

Neo-Gothic Alexander and Barbara Kelch's silver service

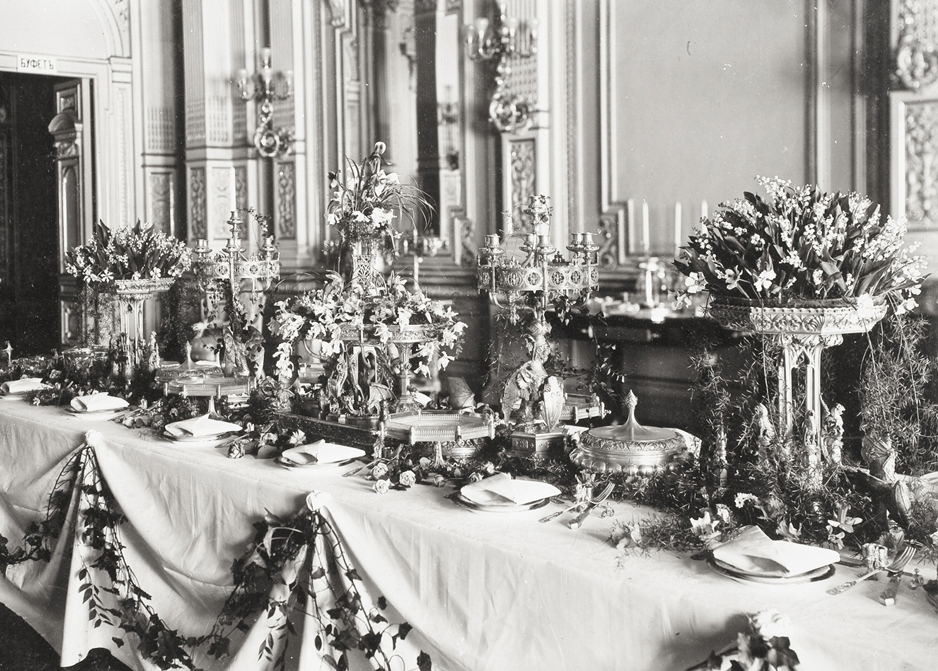
View of the Kelch silverware. Fabergé Exposition in Petersburg, 1902

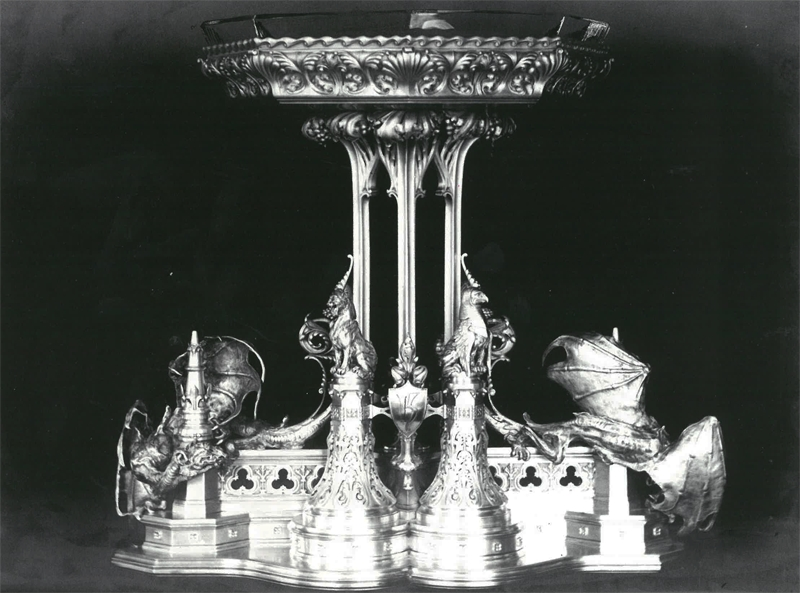
Part of the Kelch silverware. High epergne, 1900

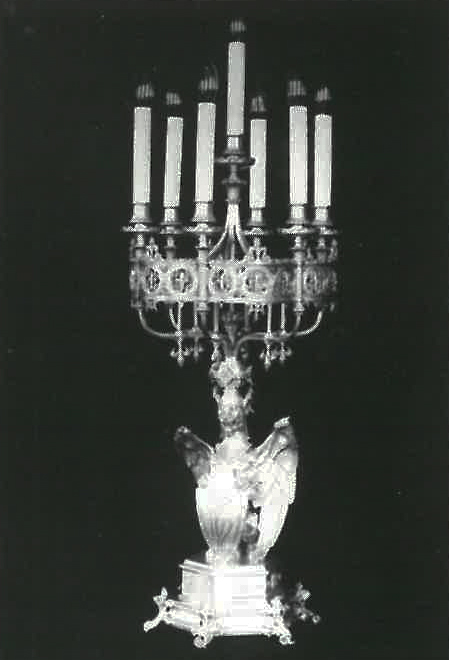
Part of the Kelch silverware. Candelabrum, 1900

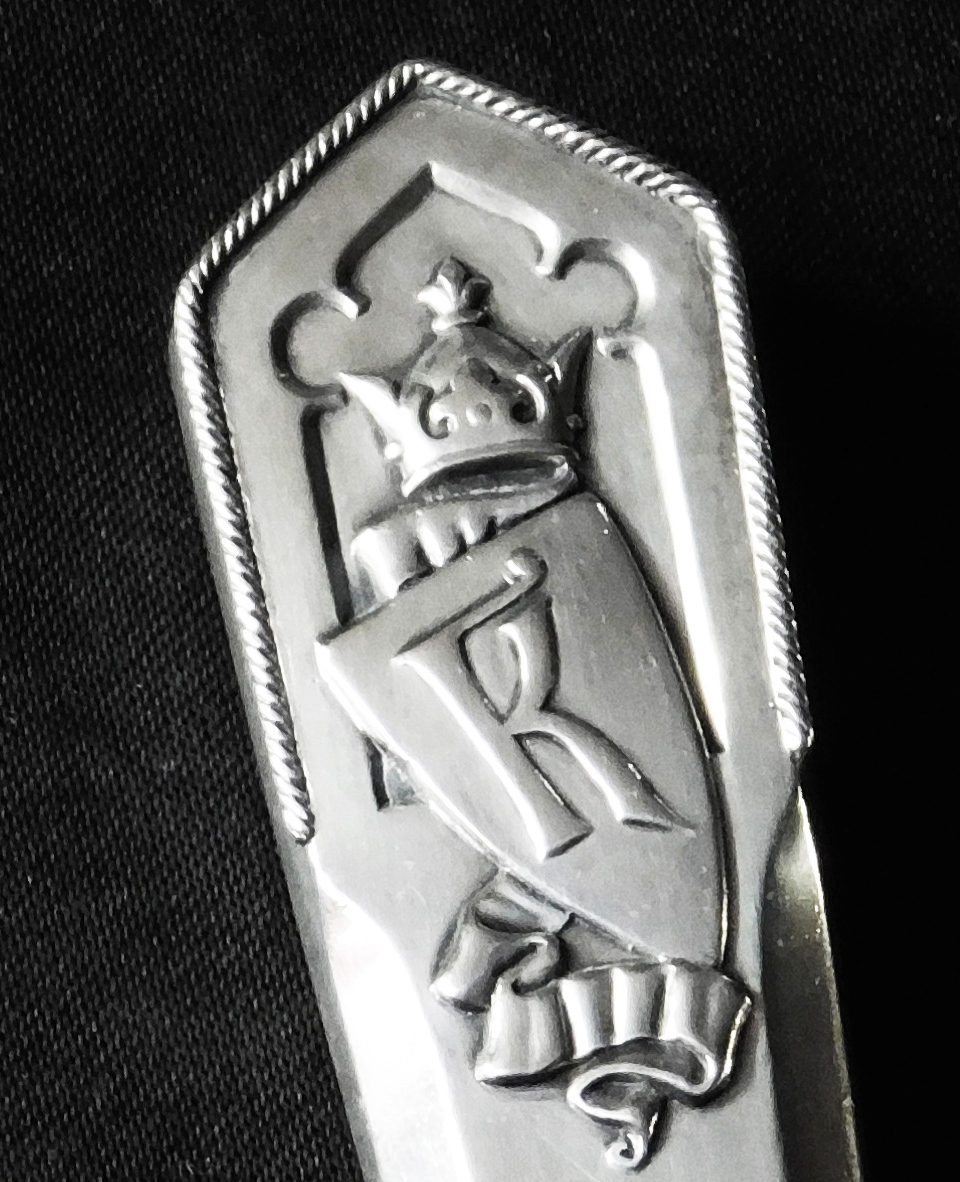
Kelch silverware. Crown-topped shield with a monogram in the form of the letter 'K'.

The Kelch Gothic Revival silver service, created in 1900, was one of the finest silver services made by Peter Carl Fabergé. The silverware was commissioned by Alexander and Barbara Kelch (Russian: Кельх, Kelkh). Peter Carl Fabergé considered it the most important silver masterpiece made in his workshop; it was also the most expensive.

Kelch’s silverware is assumed to have been melted down circa 1918, following the October Revolution. For the next hundred years, experts of Fabergé had presumed that the tableware was completely destroyed. In 2017, it appeared that items from the service had survived, having been discovered in Poland.

== History ==
The idea for designing the service in the neo-Gothic style was conceived in 1898 along with the rebuilding of the Kelch mansion in Saint Petersburg. The service was intended to complement Barbara Kelch’s Gothic scheme for the new dining room.

The tableware was designed in 1900 by the Russian architect Fedor Shekhtel, who cooperated with Fabergé. The tableware was made in 1900 in a Moscow branch of Fabergé's company. Alexander Kelch paid 125,000 rubles for the tableware, which makes it the most expensive Fabergé work that was ever made.

Parts of the Kelch’s tableware were presented on the charity exhibition of Fabergé works organized in 1902 in Saint Petersburg in Baron Paul von Dervies' mansion. This was the one and only exhibition of Fabergé works organized in the period of his activity. The exhibition presented Fabergé works belonging to Empresses Maria Feodorovna and Alexandra Feodorovna and family members of the House of Romanov and representatives of the aristocracy. The Kelch’s silver service was the only work shown at this exhibition which didn't belong to the aristocrats, but to a family of rich industrialists.

Until 1905 Kelch’s silver tableware was in the Kelch mansion in Saint Petersburg. But that year, as a result of the Kelch couple's separation, the tableware was transported to the Bazanov's palace in Moscow. After the October Revolution in 1918, the Kelch’s silver service was confiscated and melted down. For one hundred years, until 2017, it was considered to have been completely destroyed, as no parts of the service were known in any Fabergé collection. In January 2017, some pieces of cutlery appearing to come from the neo-Gothic Kelch service surfaced in the art market in Poland.

== Description ==
The Aleksander and Barbara Kelch's representative tableware was made in the neo-Gothic style. The style of silver service referred to the style and the décor of the dining room in Kelch mansion in Saint Petersburg. The decoration and ornaments used by Fabergé came from the English and German Gothic styles.

Motifs of the tableware are stylized Gothic tracery, plant ornaments, dragons, griffins, lizards, snakes and other Gothic creatures, fleurs-de-lys, and a crown-topped shield with a monogram in the form of the letter 'K'.

The tableware consisted of many dishes and objects, including: a surtout de table, two seven-arm candelabra, two high epergnes, soup tureens with lids, platters, bowls, plates, sauce boats, trays, cabarets, cutlery, salt cellars, and more.

The medieval dragons were the main motif decorating the tableware, therefore the Kelch’s tableware sometimes referred as the "Fabergé dragon tableware." The crown-topped shield with a monogram in the form of the letter 'K' is also an important motif decorating the objects belonging to the Kelch’s tableware. The pieces were marked with the Fabergé hallmark and the court jeweller hallmark.
