= Memory of Azov (Fabergé egg) =

1891 Imperial Fabergé egg

Coordinates: 55°44′58.25″N 37°36′47.90″E

Memory of Azov Fabergé egg
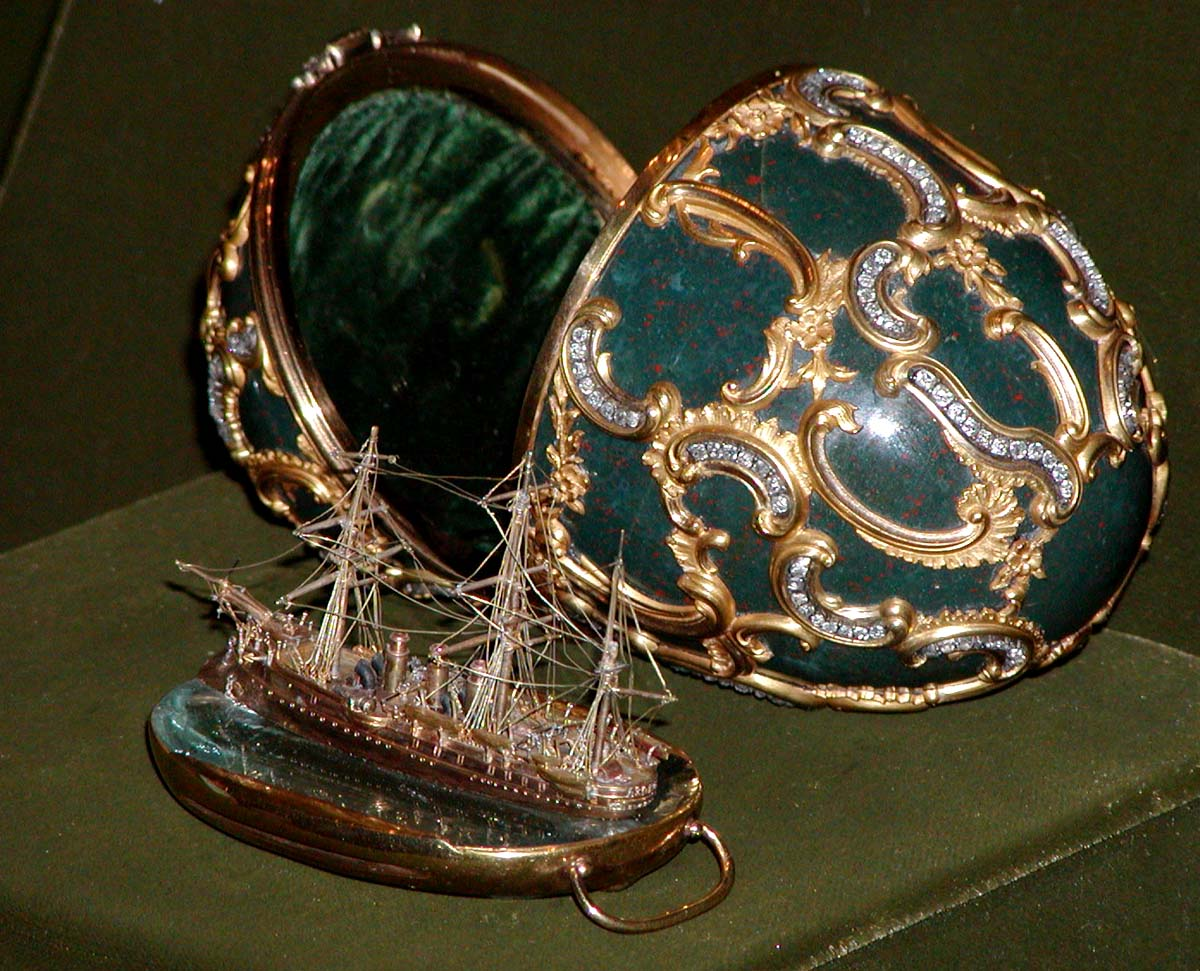
- Memory of Azov Egg
- Year delivered: 1891
- Customer: Alexander III
- Recipient: Maria Feodorovna

Current owner
- Individual or institution: Kremlin Armoury, Moscow

Design and materials
- Workmaster: Michael Perkhin and Yuri Nicolai
- Materials used: Bloodstone, ruby, diamonds, gold, platinum, aquamarine
- Height: 93 millimetres (3.7 in)
- Surprise: Replica cruiser Pamiat Azova

The Memory of Azov (or the Azova Egg) is a jewelled Easter egg made under the supervision of the Russian jeweller Peter Carl Fabergé in 1891 for Tsar Alexander III of Russia. It was presented by Alexander III as an Easter gift to his wife, the Tsarina Maria Feodorovna. It is currently held in the Kremlin Armoury Museum in Moscow.

== Design ==
Carved from a solid piece of heliotrope jasper, also known as bloodstone, the Memory of Azov Egg is decorated in the Louis XV style with a superimposed gold pattern of Rococo scrolls with brilliant diamonds and chased gold flowers. The broad flute gold bezel is set with a drop ruby and two diamonds that complete the clasp. The egg's interior is lined with green velvet.

The design of the piece is based on the egg-shaped bonbonnières in the Rococo style.

== Surprise ==
The surprise contained within is a miniature replica of the Imperial Russian Navy cruiser Pamiat Azova (Memory of Azov), executed in red and yellow gold and platinum with small diamonds for windows, set on a piece of aquamarine representing the water. The name "Azov" appears on the ship's stern. The plate has a golden frame with a loop, enabling the model to be removed from the egg.

== History ==
The egg commemorates the voyage made by Tsarevitch Nicholas and Grand Duke George of Russia aboard the Pamiat Azova to the Far East in 1890. The trip was made after a suggestion by their parents to broaden the outlook of the future Tsar and his brother. At the time, Grand Duke George was suffering from tuberculosis, and the voyage only exacerbated it. Tsarevitch Nicholas was also the victim of an attempted assassination ("Ōtsu incident") whilst in Japan and sustained a serious head wound. Although the Tsarina was presented with the egg before these events occurred, it apparently was never one of her favourite eggs.

== See also ==
- Egg decorating
