= Apple Blossom (Fabergé egg) =

1901 Fabergé Kelch Egg

Apple Blossom Fabergé egg
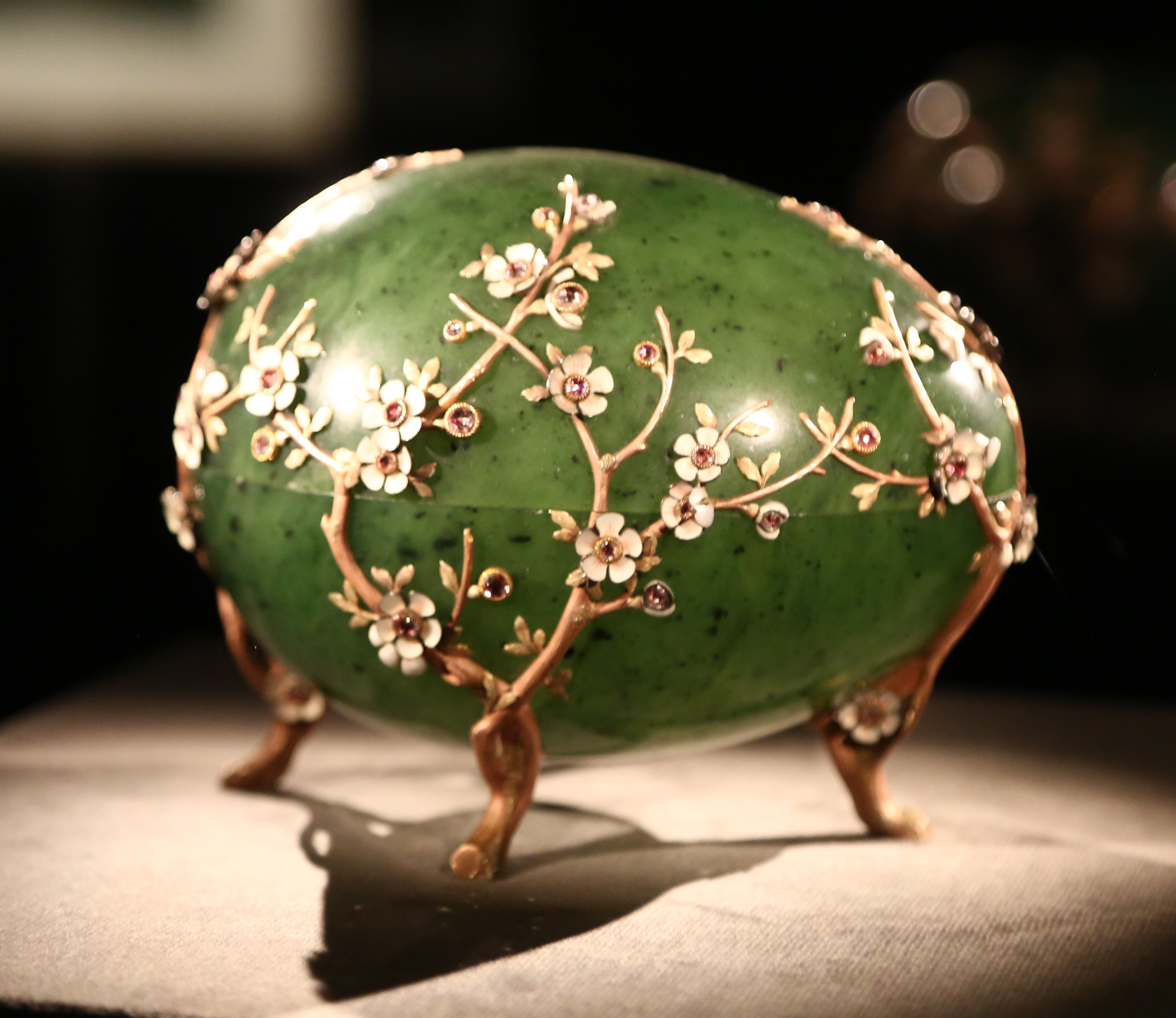
- Year delivered: 1901
- Customer: Alexander Kelch
- Recipient: Barbara Kelch-Bazanova

Current owner
- Individual or institution: State of Liechtenstein
- Year of acquisition: 2010

Design and materials
- Workmaster: Mikhail Evlampievich Perkhin
- Materials used: nephrite, green and red gold, silver, pink and white enamel, diamonds, lined with velvet
- Height: 115 millimetres (4.5 in)
- Width: 140 millimetres (5.5 in)
- Surprise: Lost

The Apple Blossom egg, also known as the Jade Chest egg, is a Fabergé egg created in the workshop of Peter Carl Fabergé for the wealthy Russian industrialist Alexander Kelch who presented it to his wife as an Easter gift in 1901. Because it was not a gift from a Russian tsar to a tsarina, it is not considered an "imperial" Fabergé egg but rather, in this instance, is called one of the "Kelch" eggs. It is one of the largest such eggs ever created in Fabergé's workshop. It is also one of the very few Fabergé eggs which lies on its side rather than upright.

In November 1996 a man named Adulph Peter Goop, an art collector from Liechtenstein, purchased the egg at a Sotheby's auction. Then, in 2010, shortly before his death, Goop bequeathed the egg to the State of Liechtenstein which now holds the egg at its Liechtensteinisches Landesmuseum in the city of Vaduz.

== See also ==
- Objet d'art
