= Michael Perkhin =

Russian silversmith (1860–1903)

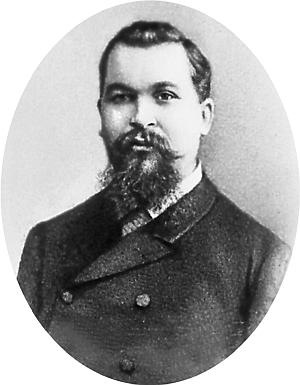
- Notable work: Faberge eggs

Michael Evlampievich Perkhin (Russian: Михаил Евлампиевич Перхин; 1860–1903) was a Russian jeweler. Born in Okulovskaya in Olonets Governorate (now Republic of Karelia), he moved to St. Petersburg, he joined the House of Fabergé. With Henrik Wigström, he was one of the two leading workmasters of the House of Fabergé.

== Career ==
Perkhin became the leading workmaster in the House of Fabergé in 1886 and supervised production of the eggs until his death in St. Petersburg in 1903. The eggs he was responsible for were marked with his initials.

He worked initially as a journeyman in the workshop of Erik August Kollin. In 1884 he qualified as a master craftsman and his artistic potential must have been obvious to Fabergé who appointed him head workmaster in 1886. His workshop produced all types of objets de fantaisie in gold, enamel and hard stones.

All the important commissions of the time, including some of the Imperial Easter Eggs, the renowned "Fabergé eggs", were made in his workshop. His period as head Fabergé workmaster is generally acknowledged to be the most artistically innovative, with a huge range of styles from neo-Rococo to Renaissance.

Perkhin was listed as a merchant of the 2nd Guild by the early 1890s and received the title of personal honorary citizen in 1895. He was also awarded a bronze medal at the Exposition Universelle in Paris in 1900.

== Notable works ==
=== Imperial Fabergé eggs ===
- Danish Palaces (Fabergé egg)
- Memory of Azov (Fabergé egg)
- Caucasus (Fabergé egg)
- Renaissance (Fabergé egg)
- Rosebud (Fabergé egg)
- Blue Serpent Clock (Fabergé egg)
- Twelve Monograms (Fabergé egg)
- Rock Crystal (Fabergé egg)
- Imperial Coronation (Fabergé egg)
- Lilies of the Valley (Fabergé egg)
- Pelican (Fabergé egg)
- Bouquet of Lilies Clock (Fabergé egg)
- Pansy (Fabergé egg)
- Trans–Siberian Railway (Fabergé egg)
- Cockerel (Fabergé egg)
- Gatchina Palace (Fabergé egg)
- Clover Leaf (Fabergé egg)
- Empire Nephrite (Fabergé egg)
- Peter the Great (Fabergé egg)
- Royal Danish (Fabergé egg)

=== Kelch Fabergé eggs ===
- Kelch Hen (Fabergé egg)
- Twelve Panel (Fabergé egg)
- Pine Cone (Fabergé egg)
- Apple Blossom (Fabergé egg)
- Rocaille (Fabergé egg)
- Bonbonnière (Fabergé egg)
- Kelch Chanticleer (Fabergé egg)

=== Other Fabergé eggs ===
- Duchess of Marlborough (Fabergé egg)
- Resurrection (Fabergé egg)
- Rose Quartz (Fabergé egg)
- Rothschild (Fabergé egg)
- Scandinavian (Fabergé egg)
- Spring Flowers (Fabergé egg)

== Sources ==
- Faber, Toby (2008). Faberge's Eggs: The Extraordinary Story of the Masterpieces That Outlived an Empire. Random House. ISBN 978-1-4000-6550-9.
- Forbes, Christopher; Prinz von Hohenzollern, Johann Georg (1990). FABERGE; The Imperial Eggs. Prestel. ASIN B000YA9GOM.
- Lowes, Will (2001). Fabergé Eggs: A Retrospective Encyclopedia. Scarecrow Press. ISBN 0-8108-3946-6.
- Snowman, A Kenneth (1988). Carl Faberge: Goldsmith to the Imperial Court of Russia. Gramercy. ISBN 0-517-40502-4.
