= Apple Blossom Festival =

Apple Blossom Festival can refer to several different events:

- Annapolis Valley Apple Blossom Festival, in Nova Scotia's Annapolis Valley
- Shenandoah Apple Blossom Festival, in Virginia's Shenandoah Valley
- Washington State Apple Blossom Festival, in Wenatchee, Washington
- Williamson Apple Blossom Festival, in Williamson, New York
- Gettysburg Apple Blossom Festival, in Gettysburg, Pennsylvania
- St. Joseph Apple Blossom Festival, in St. Joseph, Missouri
