= Bonbonnière (Fabergé egg) =

1903 Fabergé Kelch Egg

Bonbonnière Fabergé egg
- Year delivered: 1903
- Customer: Alexander Kelch
- Recipient: Barbara Kelch-Bazanova

Current owner
- Individual or institution: Estate of the late Kerry Packer, Australia
- Year of acquisition: 1990

Design and materials
- Workmaster: Mikhail Evlampievich Perkhin
- Materials used: gold, diamonds, chalcedony, pearls, transparent white enamel, velvet
- Height: 127 millimetres (5.0 in)
- Surprise: Pendant inside of a second egg

The Bonbonnière egg is one of the Fabergé eggs created in the workshop of Peter Carl Fabergé for the wealthy Russian industrialist Alexander Kelch who presented it to his wife as an Easter gift in 1903. Because it was not a gift from a Russian tsar to his tsarina, it is not considered an "imperial" Fabergé egg but rather, in this instance, is called one of the seven "Kelch" eggs. It is the sixth egg in this series. A bonbonnière is a candy box (lit. a bearer of bonbons) in French.

It is made of gold, diamonds, chalcedony, pearls, transparent white enamel, and velvet. The miniature box "surprise" inside the main box/ egg is made of agate and has been decorated with brilliant cut stones and a cabochon ruby. Inside this there is a pendant of gold and enamel.

The egg is owned by the estate of Australian media tycoon Kerry Packer, purchased through Christie's auction house in 1990 from a private American owner.

== See also ==
- Objet d'art
