= Gatchina Palace (Fabergé egg) =

1901 Imperial Fabergé egg

Gatchina Palace Fabergé egg
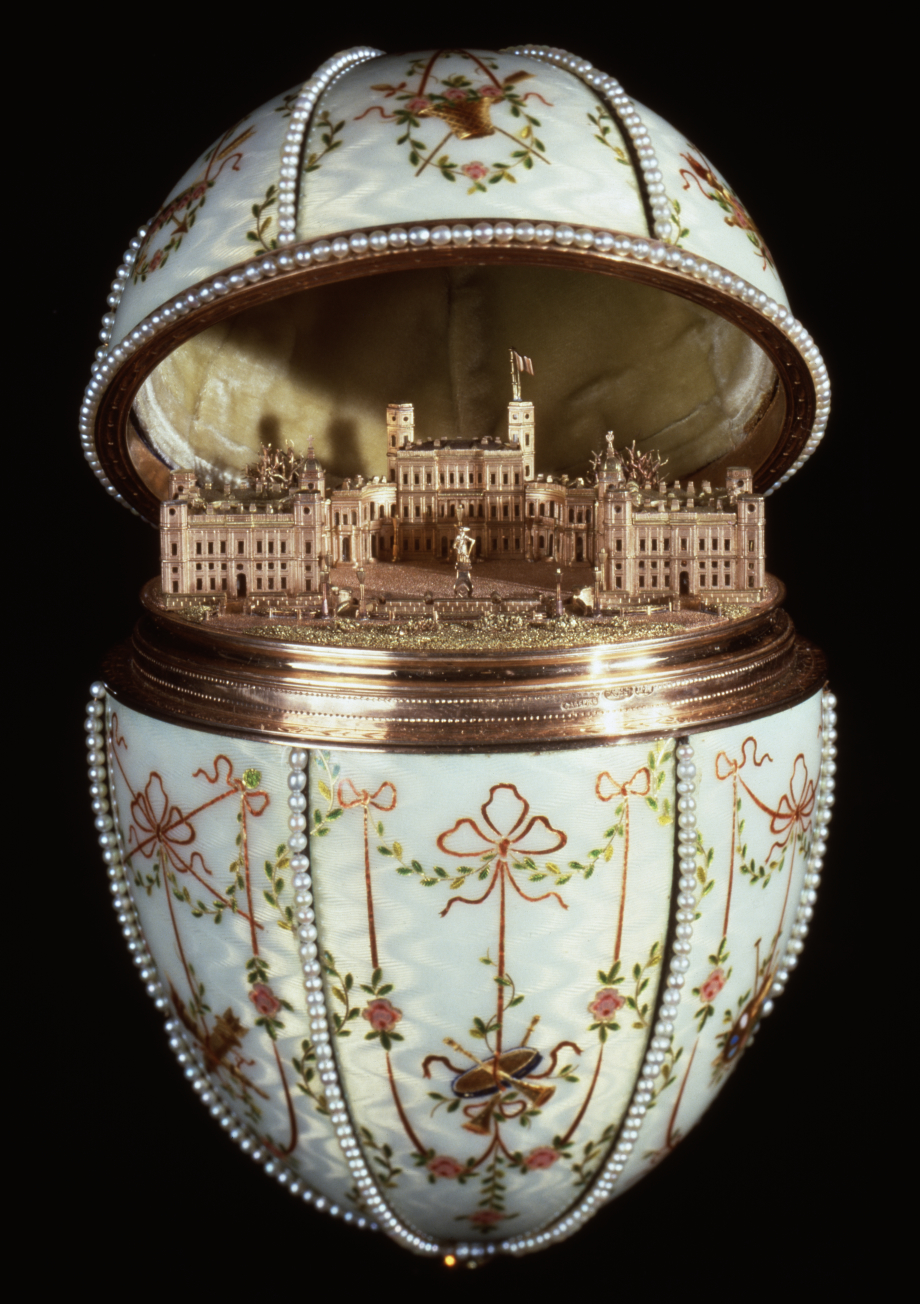
- Gatchina Palace Egg open
- Year delivered: 1901
- Customer: Nicholas II
- Recipient: Maria Feodorovna

Current owner
- Individual or institution: Walters Art Museum
- Year of acquisition: 1931

Design and materials
- Workmaster: Michael Perkhin
- Materials used: Enamel, gold, silver-gilt, diamond, rock crystal
- Height: 127 millimetres (5.0 in)
- Width: 89 millimetres (3.5 in)
- Surprise: Gold replica of the palace at Gatchina

The Gatchina Palace egg is a jewelled, enameled Easter egg made under the supervision of the Russian jeweler Peter Carl Fabergé in 1901, for Nicholas II of Russia. Nicholas II presented it to his mother, the Dowager Empress Maria Feodorovna, at Easter in 1901. The egg opens to reveal a surprise miniature gold replica of the Gatchina Palace that was built for Count Grigory Orlov and was later acquired by Tsar Paul I. It is one of two Imperial Easter eggs in the collection of the Walters Art Museum in Baltimore, Maryland.

== Description ==
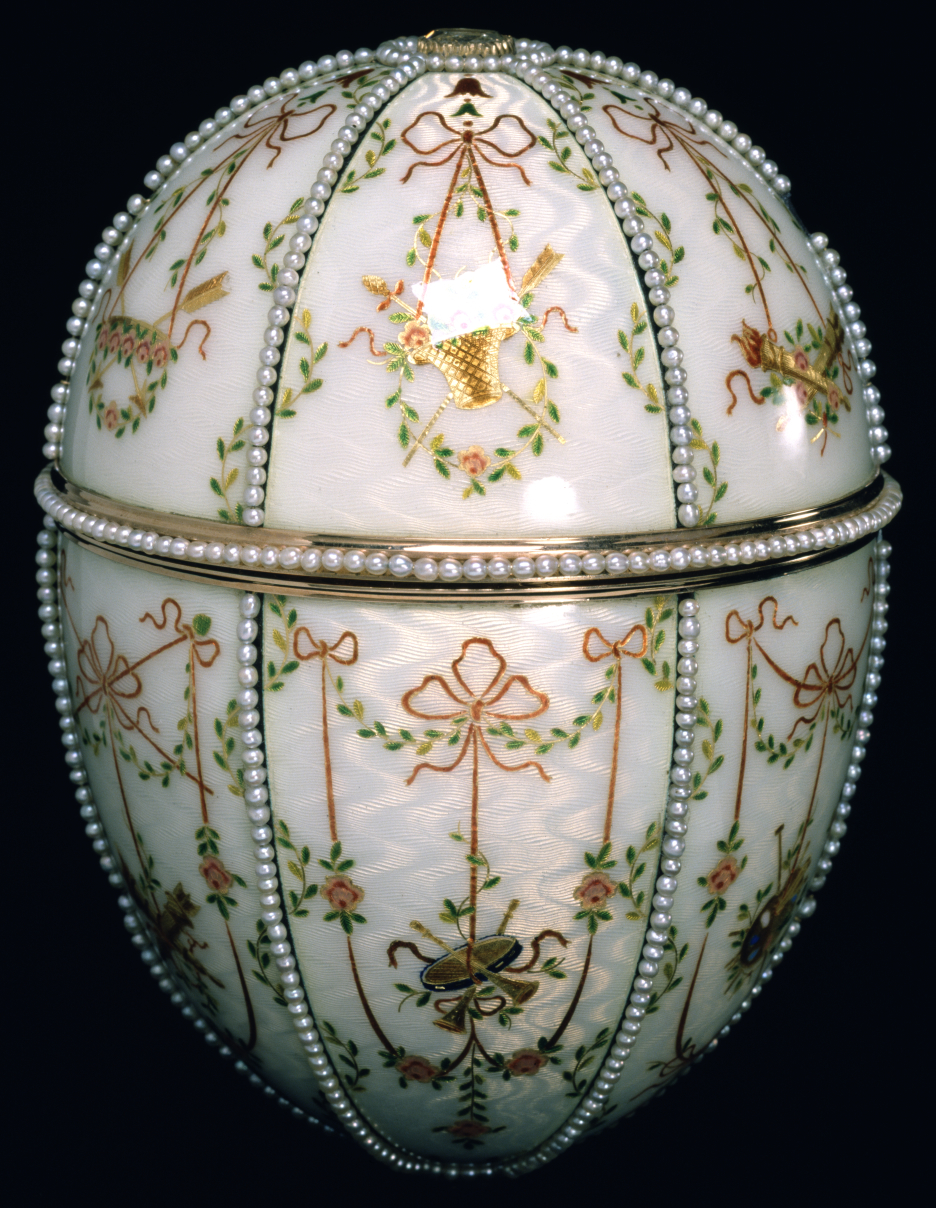
Gatchina Palace egg closed

The egg was created by Fabergé's workmaster, Mikhail Evlampievich Perkhin (Russian, 1860–1903), and is crafted from gold, enamel, silver-gilt, portrait diamonds, rock crystal, and seed pearls. Detailed work around the palace in the surprise shows cannons, a flag, a statue of Paul I (1754–1801), and elements of the landscape.

The miniature palace is not fixed inside the egg and can be removed, like the 1908 Alexander Palace egg, which Fabergé would create seven years later for Alexandra Fyodorovna. The dimensions are 4 15/16 x 3 9/16 in. (12.5 x 9.1 cm).

== Surprise ==
The egg opens to reveal a miniature gold replica of Gatchina Palace, the Dowager Empress's residence outside Saint Petersburg.

== Subsequent ownership ==
In 1920, the egg was in the possession of Alexander Polovtsov, who was a former employee at the Gatchina Palace and later started an antique shop in Paris. It is not known how Mr. Polovtsov acquired the egg.

In 1930, this egg was sold, along with the 1907 Rose Trellis egg, to American Henry Walters and became a part of the Walters Art Museum Collection in 1931. In 1936, the egg was exhibited with the Rose Trellis egg at the Walters Art Museum in Baltimore, Maryland, and it has been on permanent display since 1952.

== See also ==
- Egg decorating

== Sources ==
- Faber, Toby (2008). Faberge's Eggs: The Extraordinary Story of the Masterpieces That Outlived an Empire. Random House. ISBN 978-1-4000-6550-9.
- Forbes, Christopher; Prinz von Hohenzollern, Johann Georg (1990). FABERGE; The Imperial Eggs. Prestel. ASIN B000YA9GOM.
- Lowes, Will (2001). Fabergé Eggs: A Retrospective Encyclopedia. Scarecrow Press. ISBN 0-8108-3946-6.
- Snowman, A Kenneth (1988). Carl Faberge: Goldsmith to the Imperial Court of Russia. Gramercy. ISBN 0-517-40502-4.
