= A La Vieille Russie =

Antique store in New York

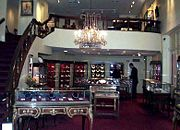
- Interior of the store in 2008
- Coordinates: 40°45′51.55″N 73°58′22.11″W

A La Vieille Russie is a New York City-based antique store specializing in European and American antique jewelry, Imperial Russian works of art, 18th-century European gold snuff boxes, and objets d’art. Founded in Kiev in 1851, A La Vieille Russie later relocated to Paris around 1920 and to New York thereafter. From 1961 to 2017, the store was located at 781 Fifth Avenue, near the southeast entrance of Central Park.

In November 2017, A La Vieille Russie moved to a new showroom at 745 Fifth Avenue, on the fourth floor. Featured are items by Carl Fabergé that were created for members of the Romanov court in Russia and for other wealthy patrons in turn-of-the-century Europe. A La Vieille Russie has bought and sold many of the Fabergé Imperial Easter Eggs.

== History ==
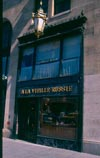
Former store at 781 5th Ave.

A La Vieille Russie, a family business since its founding in Kiev in 1851, left the turmoil of the Russian Revolution and was re-established in Paris around 1920 by Jacques Zolotnitsky, the grandson of the founder, with his nephew Léon Grinberg. The shop became a focal point for Russian émigré aristocracy and intellectual activity, attracting a range of royal and artistic clients. These included Queen Marie of Romania, Grand Duchesses Xenia and Olga (sisters of Tsar Nicholas II), the Duke and Duchess of Windsor, King Farouk, Salvador Dali, and Marlene Dietrich.

Alexander Schaffer brought the firm to America, with his first shop in New York’s Rockefeller Center. The gallery relocated to Fifth Avenue and 60th Street in 1941. In America, A La Vieille Russie quickly established itself as a leader in the market for Fabergé and Russian Imperial treasures. It helped form all of the major American Fabergé collections, such as the Forbes Magazine Collection, many of which are now in museums such as the Virginia Museum of Fine Arts and the Cleveland Museum of Art. The gallery also specializes in European and American antique jewelry, 18th-century European gold snuff boxes, and antique Russian decorative arts, including silver, enamel, and porcelain, as well as Russian paintings, icons, and furniture.

In 1961, A La Vieille Russie moved down the block to 59th Street and remained there for 56 years. In fall 2017, A La Vieille Russie moved to a showroom one block south at 745 Fifth Avenue.

Still a multi-generational family business, under the direction of brothers, Messrs. Paul and Peter L. Schaffer, and Paul's son, Dr. Mark A. Schaffer, A La Vieille Russie continues to deal in fine art and antiques.

The gallery exhibits annually at TEFAF Maastricht in the Netherlands, TEFAF NY Fall, and New York's Winter Show. A La Vieille Russie is a member of the National Antique and Art Dealers Association of America (NAADAA) and the Art and Antique Dealers League of America.

A La Vieille Russie also makes regular appearances on Antiques Roadshow.

Jewelry from A La Vieille Russie's collection has made various red carpet appearances, most recently at the 2021 Met Gala. Theater producer Jordan Roth wore an amethyst Boivin necklace, and Bee Carrozzini, daughter of Vogue editor-in-chief Anna Wintour, wore a Victorian rock crystal necklace.

== Key exhibitions at A La Vieille Russie ==
- Fabergé. 1949.
- Antique Automatons. 1950.
- Russian Icons. 1962.
- The Art of the Goldsmith and the Jeweler. 1968.
- Fabergé. 1983.
- An Imperial Fascination: Porcelain. Dining with the Czars. Peterhof. 1991.
- Alexandre Iacovleff – Paintings and Drawings. 1993.
- Golden Years of Fabergé. Drawings and Objects from the Wigström Workshop. 2000.
- Mechanical Wonders: The Sandoz Collection. 2011.
