= Clover Leaf (Fabergé egg) =

1902 Imperial Fabergé egg

Clover Leaf Fabergé egg
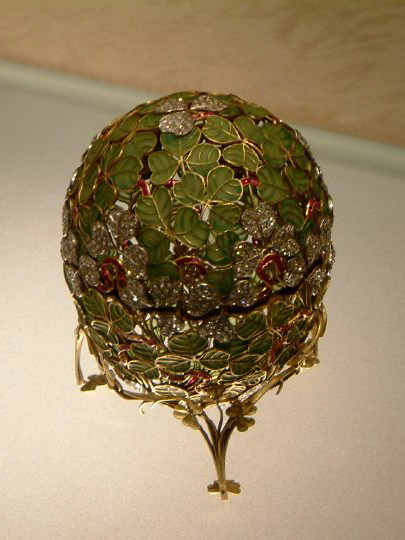
- The egg on its original Art Nouveau matching stand
- Year delivered: 1902
- Customer: Nicholas II
- Recipient: Alexandra Feodorovna

Current owner
- Individual or institution: Kremlin Armoury, Moscow
- Year of acquisition: 1933

Design and materials
- Workmaster: Michael Perkhin
- Materials used: Gold, platinum, ruby, diamonds
- Height: 98 millimetres (3.9 in)
- Surprise: Four-leaf clover with twenty-three diamonds, and four miniature portraits (missing)

The Clover Leaf egg is a jewelled Easter egg made under the supervision of the Russian jeweller Peter Carl Fabergé in 1902 for Tsar Nicholas II of Russia. It was presented by Nicholas as an Easter gift to his wife, the Tsarina Alexandra Feodorovna. It is currently held in the Kremlin Armoury Museum in Moscow, and it is one of the few imperial Fabergé eggs that were never sold after the Russian Revolution.

== Design ==
The Clover Leaf egg is made of an openwork pattern of stems and leaves of clover forming the shape of an egg. The gaps between the metal outline of the leaves are covered with transparent bright green enamel. A very thin golden ribbon paved with rubies curls through the foliage. At the time, the production of transparent enamel was still a new method, and often suffered from problems while cooling. There are no flaws in the enamel of the Clover Leaf Egg, but it is considered too fragile to travel.

== Surprise ==
The surprise in the egg has been lost but according to archives it was a four-leaf clover with twenty-three diamonds, and four miniature portraits of the four daughters of the Tsar: Olga, Tatiana, Maria, and Anastasia.

== See also ==
- Egg decorating

== Sources ==
- Faber, Toby (2008). Faberge's Eggs: The Extraordinary Story of the Masterpieces That Outlived an Empire. Random House. ISBN 978-1-4000-6550-9.
- Forbes, Christopher; Prinz von Hohenzollern, Johann Georg (1990). FABERGE; The Imperial Eggs. Prestel. ASIN B000YA9GOM.
- Lowes, Will (2001). Fabergé Eggs: A Retrospective Encyclopedia. Scarecrow Press. ISBN 0-8108-3946-6.
- Snowman, A Kenneth (1988). Carl Faberge: Goldsmith to the Imperial Court of Russia. Gramercy. ISBN 0-517-40502-4.
