= Objet d'art =

Small, nonfunctional work of art

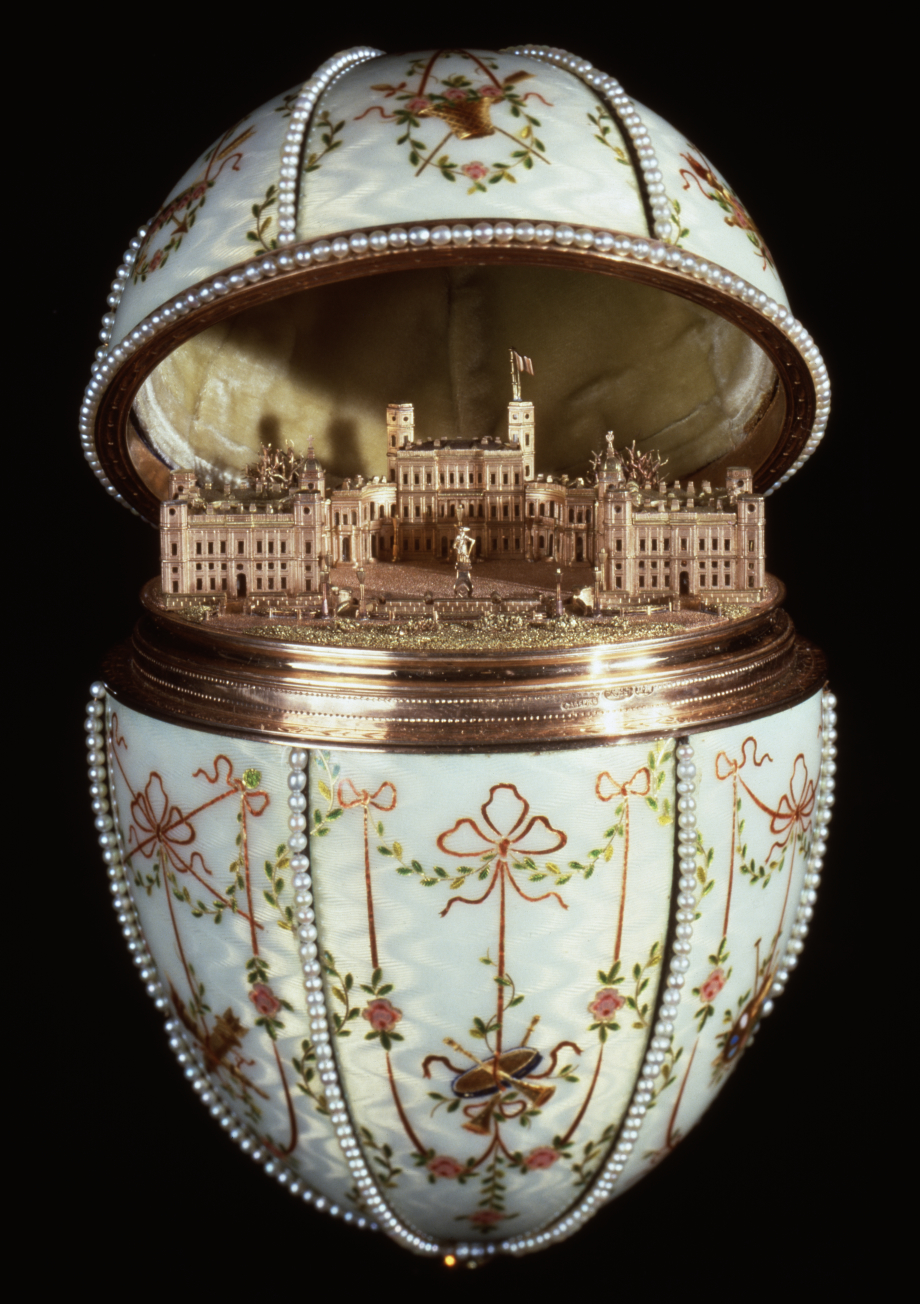
Objet d’art: The Gatchina Palace Egg contains a miniature of the Gatchina Palace of Catherine the Great.

In art history, the French term objet d'art (/ˌɒbʒeɪ ˈdɑːr/; French pronunciation: [ɔbʒɛ daʁ]) describes an ornamental work of art, and the term objets d'art describes a range of works of art, usually small and three-dimensional, made of high-quality materials, and a finely-rendered finish that emphasises the aesthetics of the artefact. Artists create and produce objets d’art in the fields of the decorative arts and metalwork, porcelain and vitreous enamel; figurines, plaquettes, and engraved gems; ivory carvings and semi-precious hardstone carvings; tapestries, antiques, and antiquities; and books with fine bookbinding.

The National Maritime Museum, Greenwich, London, describes their accumulated artworks as a: "collection of objets d'art [which] comprises over 800 objects. These are mostly small, decorative art items that fall outside the scope of the Museum's ceramic, plate, textiles, and glass collections." The artwork collection also includes metal curtain ties, a lacquered papier-maché tray, tobacco boxes, cigarette cases, découpage (cut-paper items), portrait miniatures, a gilt-brass clock finial, plaques, statuettes, plaquettes, a horse brass, a metal pipe tamper, a small glass painting, et cetera.

== Objet de vertu ==
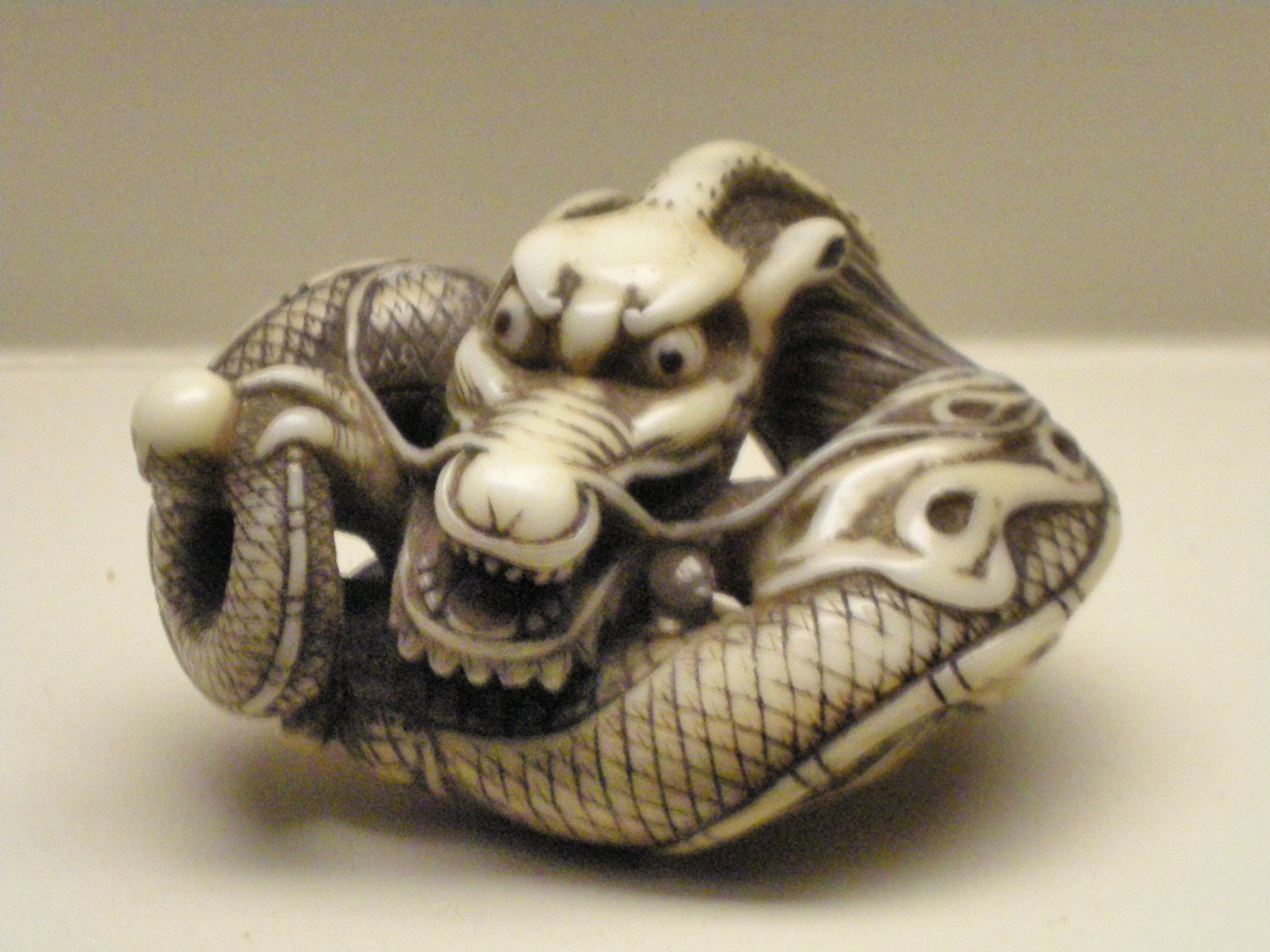
Objet d’art: A netsuke ivory carving from Japan, c. 18th or 19th century, coloured with black ink

The objet de vertu, wherein vertu suggests rich materials and a higher standard of refined manufacture and finish; the classification usually excludes objects made for realising a practical function. As works of art, objets de vertu reflect the rarified aesthetic and conspicuous consumption characteristic of an aristocratic court—of the late-medieval Burgundian dukes, the Mughal emperors, or Ming China—such as the Lycurgus Cup, which is a cage cup made of Roman glass; the Byzantine agate "Rubens vase"; the Roman glass "Portland Vase", and onyx and chalcedony cameo carvings, whilst the pre–World War I production of objets d'art featured Fabergé eggs made of precious metals and decorated with gemstones.

A comparable term that appears in 18th- and 19th-century French sale catalogs, though now less used, is objets de curiosité, "objects of curiosity", now devolved into the less-valued curio. Elaborate late Renaissance display pieces in silver that incorporate organic elements such as ostrich eggs, nuts of the coco de mer, and sea-shells are grouped in a volume, published in 1991, as "The Curiousities" in the catalogues of the Waddesdon Bequest at the British Museum.

== Images ==
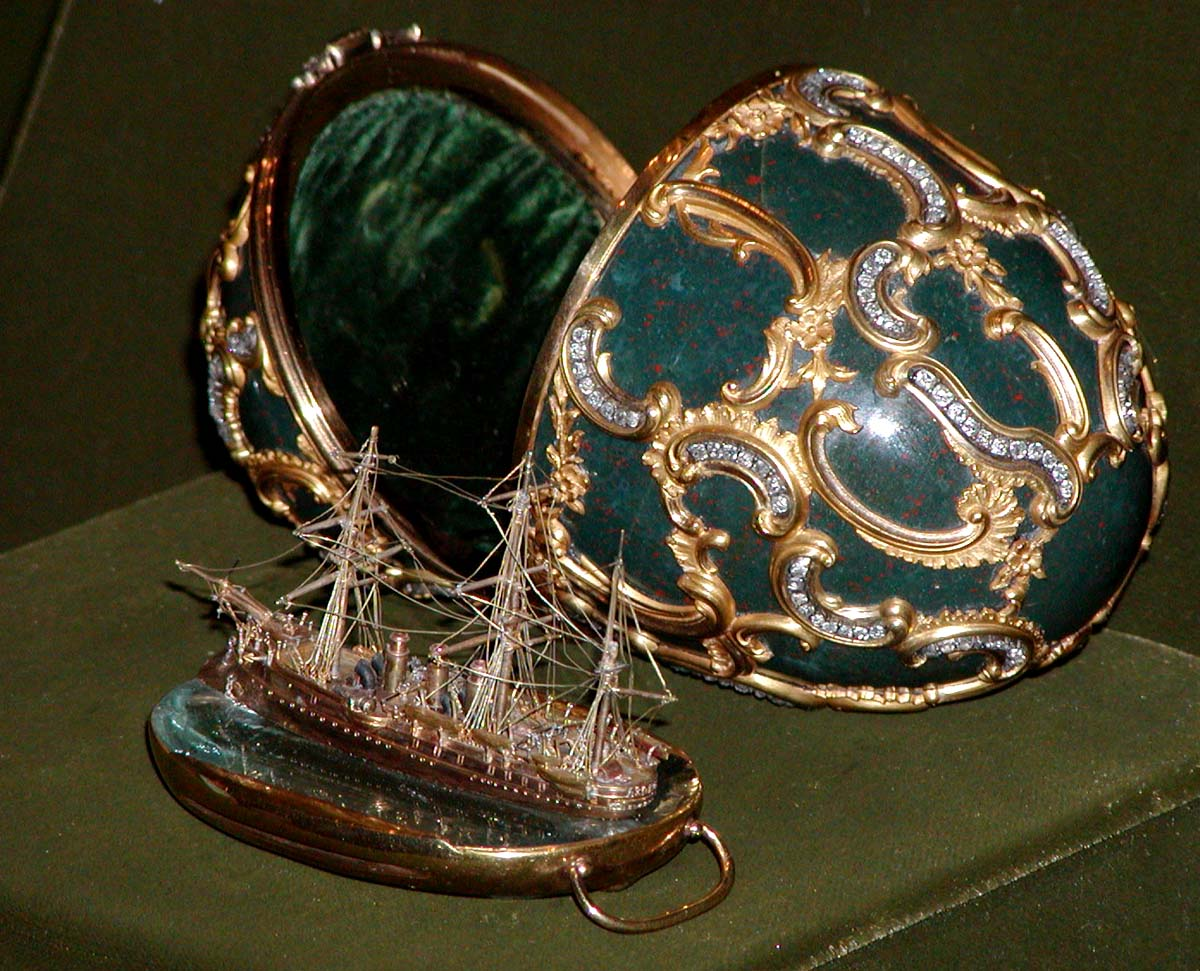
An objet de vertu by excellence, Fabergé's "Memory of Azov Egg" (1891), contains a ship model wrought of gold.

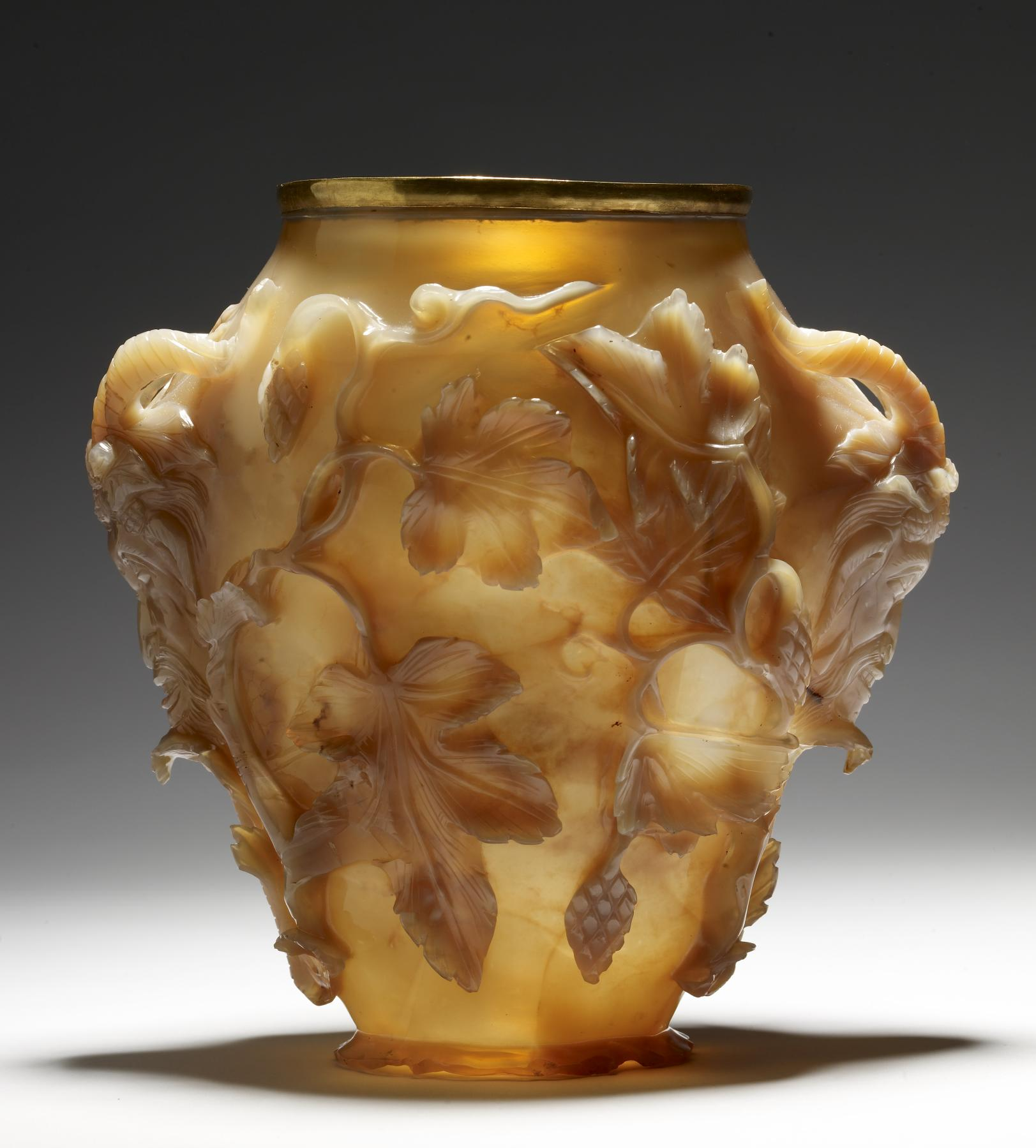
The Rubens Vase, carved in high relief from a single piece of agate, 4th century

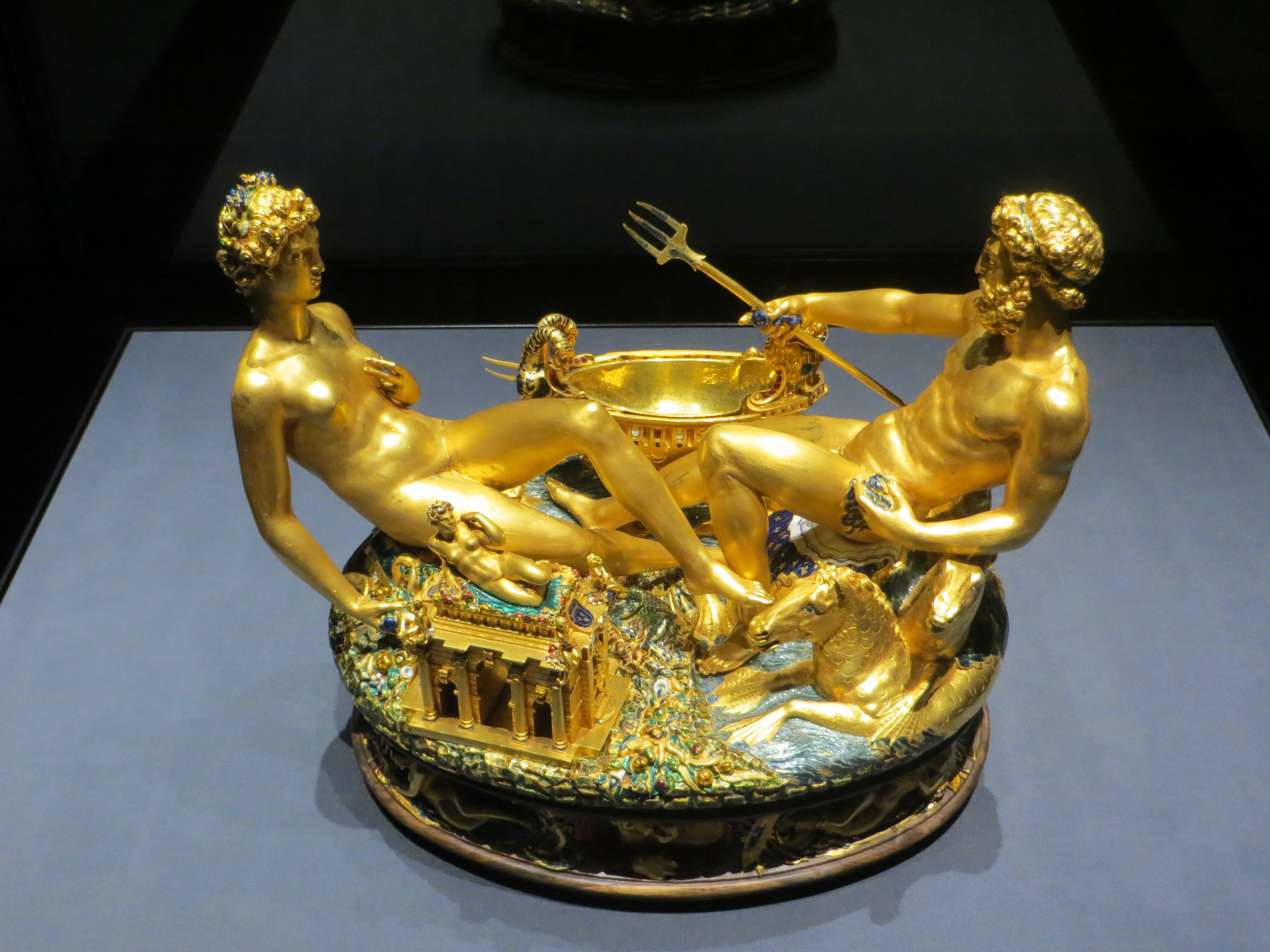
In Benvenuto Cellini's "table salt cellar", extravagant invention and richness of materials overwhelm any practical use.

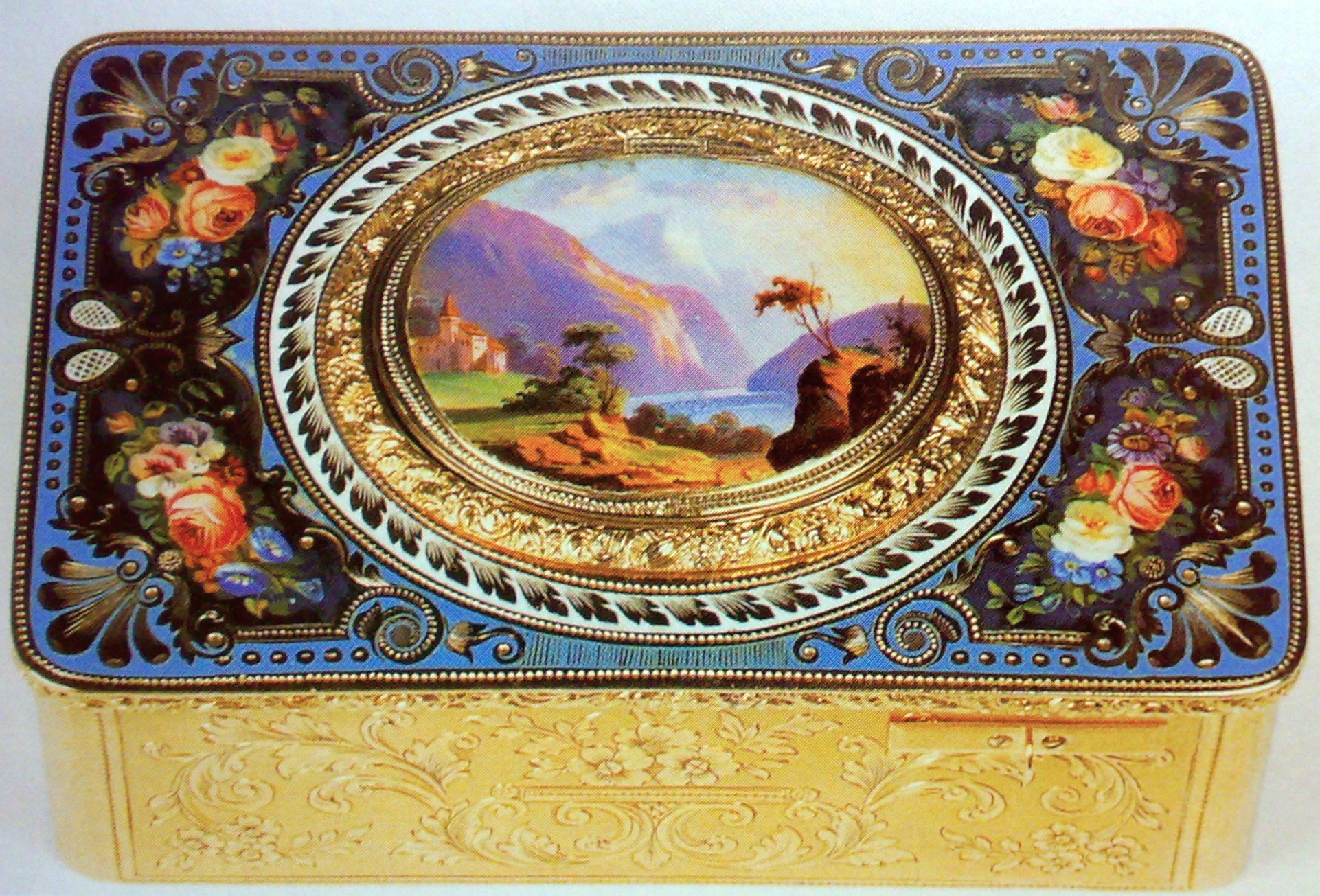
A Swiss singing bird box with a bucolic lake scene on the lid, c. 1825, another example of an objet de vertu

== See also ==
- Treasury
- Cabinet of curiosities
- Okimono, the Japanese equivalent
