= Boiled egg =

Egg dish

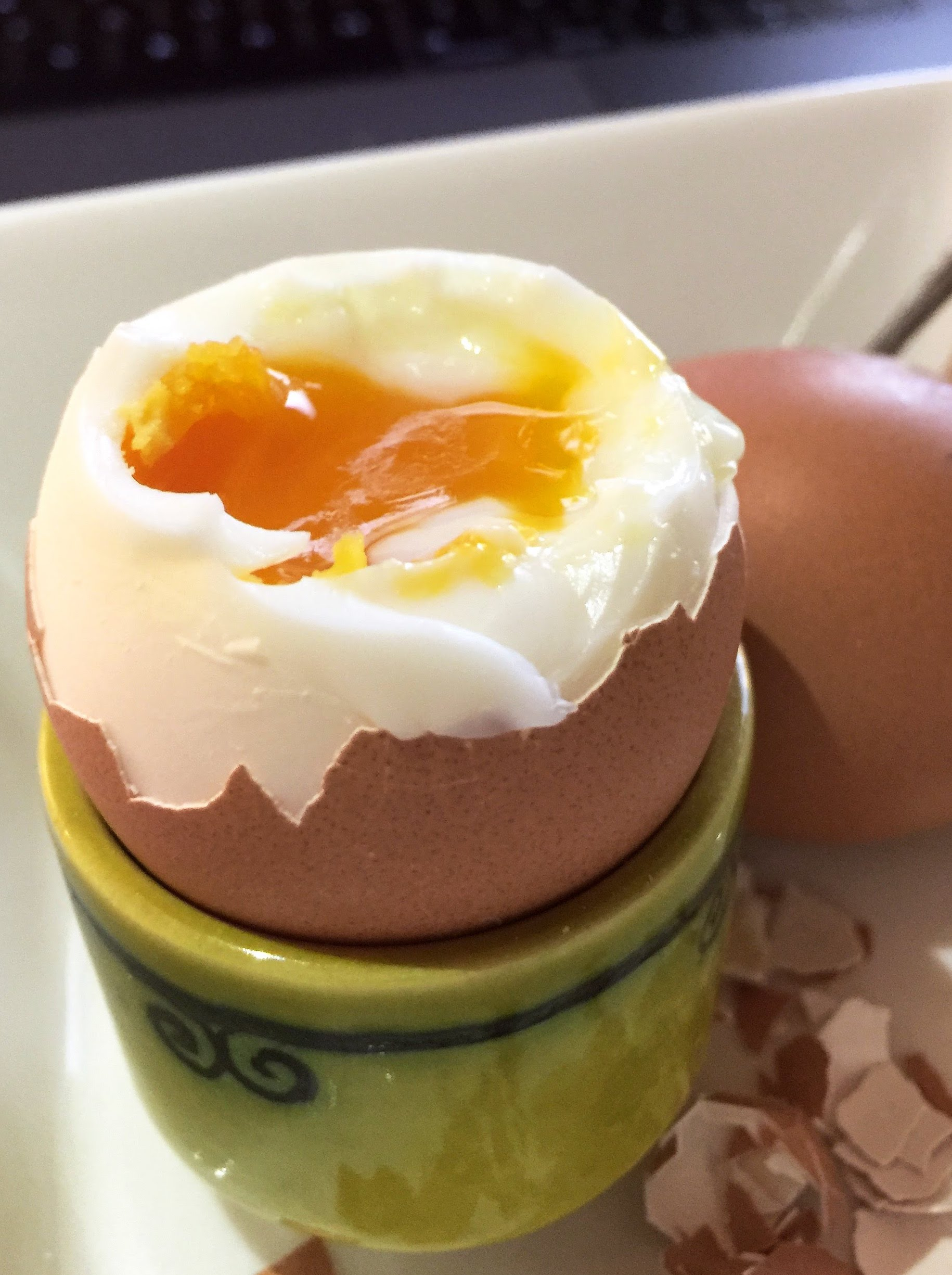
- A soft-boiled egg served in the half shell
- Alternative names: Dippy egg
- Main ingredients: Eggs (typically chicken/bird)
- Variations: Baked eggs, starting temperature, preparation
- Food energy (per 100 g serving): 136 kcal (570 kJ)
Nutritional value
(per 100 g serving)
- Protein: 14 g
- Fat: 9 g
- Carbohydrate: 0 g

Boiled eggs are a food typically made using chicken eggs. They are cooked with their shells unbroken, usually by immersion in boiling water. Hard-boiled or hard-cooked eggs are cooked so that the egg white and egg yolk both solidify, while soft-boiled eggs may leave the yolk, and sometimes the white, at least partially liquid. Boiled eggs are a popular breakfast food around the world.

Besides boiling water immersion, there are a few different methods to make boiled eggs. Eggs can also be cooked below the boiling temperature, i.e. coddling, or they can be steamed. The egg timer was named for commonly being used to time the boiling of eggs.

== History ==
Eggs have a long history of use as food, following the history of the domestic chicken, and recipes that include boiled eggs are found in the first known cookbook, De re coquinaria, in which at least one recipe calls for the use of preserved boiled eggs. Alexander Pope recommended a method of cooking eggs over the embers or ashes of an open fire.

== Scientific background ==
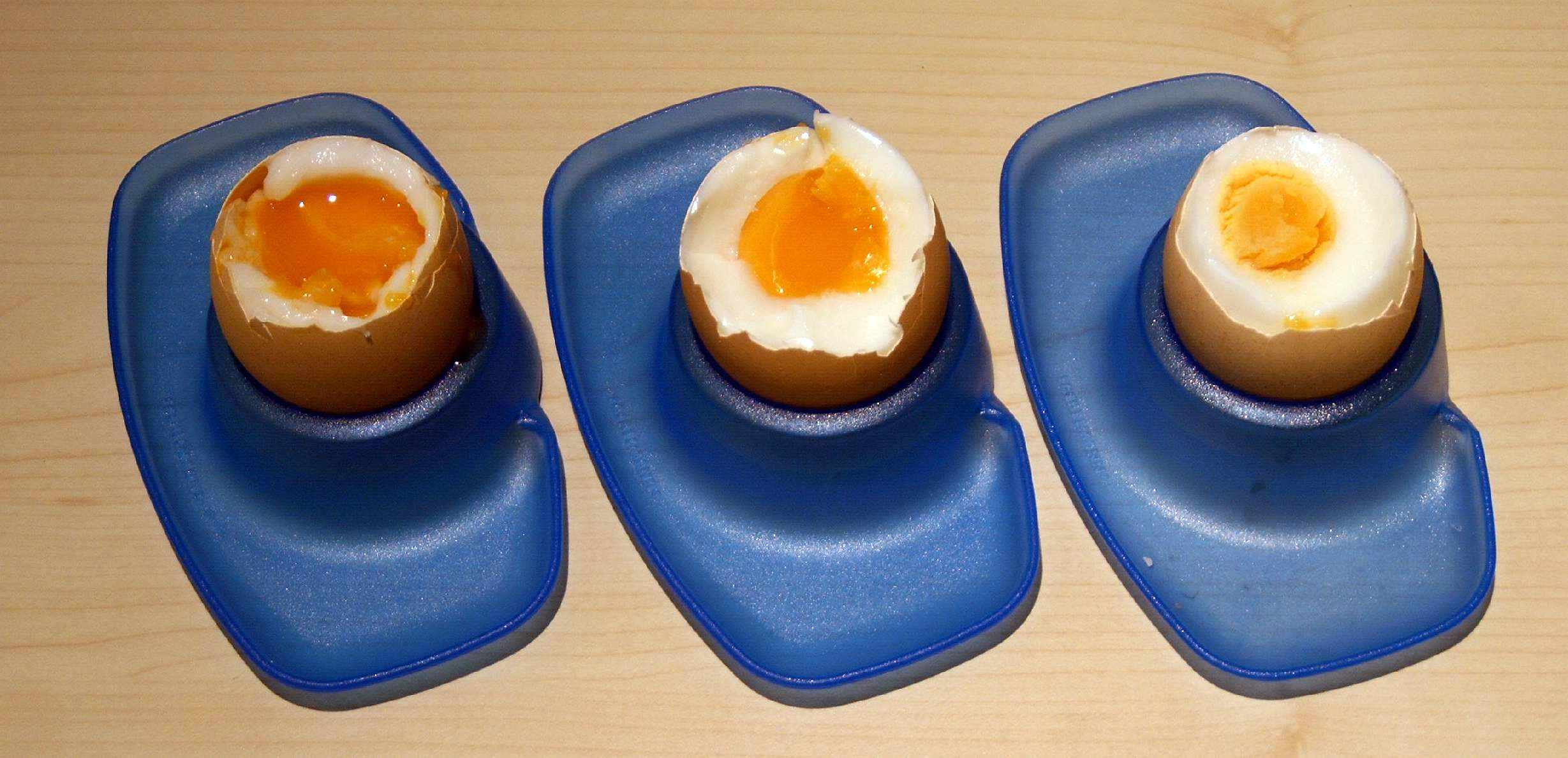
Boiled eggs, increasing in boiling time from left to right: 4 minutes, 7 minutes and 9 minutes

The process of cooking an egg causes the proteins within the yolk and albumin to denature and solidify, resulting in a solid egg white and yolk. Coagulation (denaturing) of egg white proteins begins in the 55–60 °C (131–140 °F) temperature range, and egg yolks thicken at the slightly higher temperature of 65 °C (149 °F), solidifying at 70 °C (158 °F). As such, the yolk of an egg will never solidify before the white, though in a boiled egg heat will take longer to reach the yolk through the albumin (compared to a fried egg), making this doubly true. The process may be reversed through breaking the connections between the proteins, which has been demonstrated through the application of either sodium borohydride or vitamin C.

Although the white starts coagulating earlier, it also stops denaturing later, at 85 °C (185 °F) when it takes on a tender but solid texture. As a result, it is difficult to produce an egg with both a solid white and a thickened but non-solid yolk. A peeled boiled egg may appear concave or flat on one end due to the presence of an air pocket (or "air cell") that allows a chick from an otherwise fertilized egg to take its first breath before hatching; this occurs more often in older eggs with larger air cells due to a decrease in moisture.

== Variations ==
There are variations both in degree of cooking and in the method of how eggs are boiled, and a variety of kitchen gadgets for making boiled eggs exist.

=== Hard-boiled eggs ===
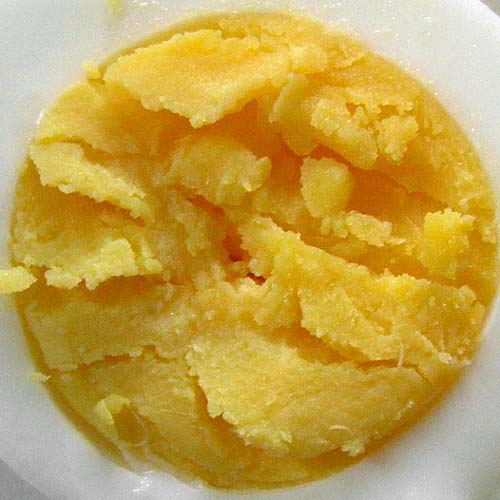
Cross-section of a hard boiled egg

Hard-boiled or hard-cooked eggs are boiled long enough for the yolk to solidify (19 minutes). They can be eaten warm or cold. Hard-boiled eggs are the basis for many dishes, such as egg salad, cobb salad and Scotch eggs, and may be further prepared as deviled eggs.

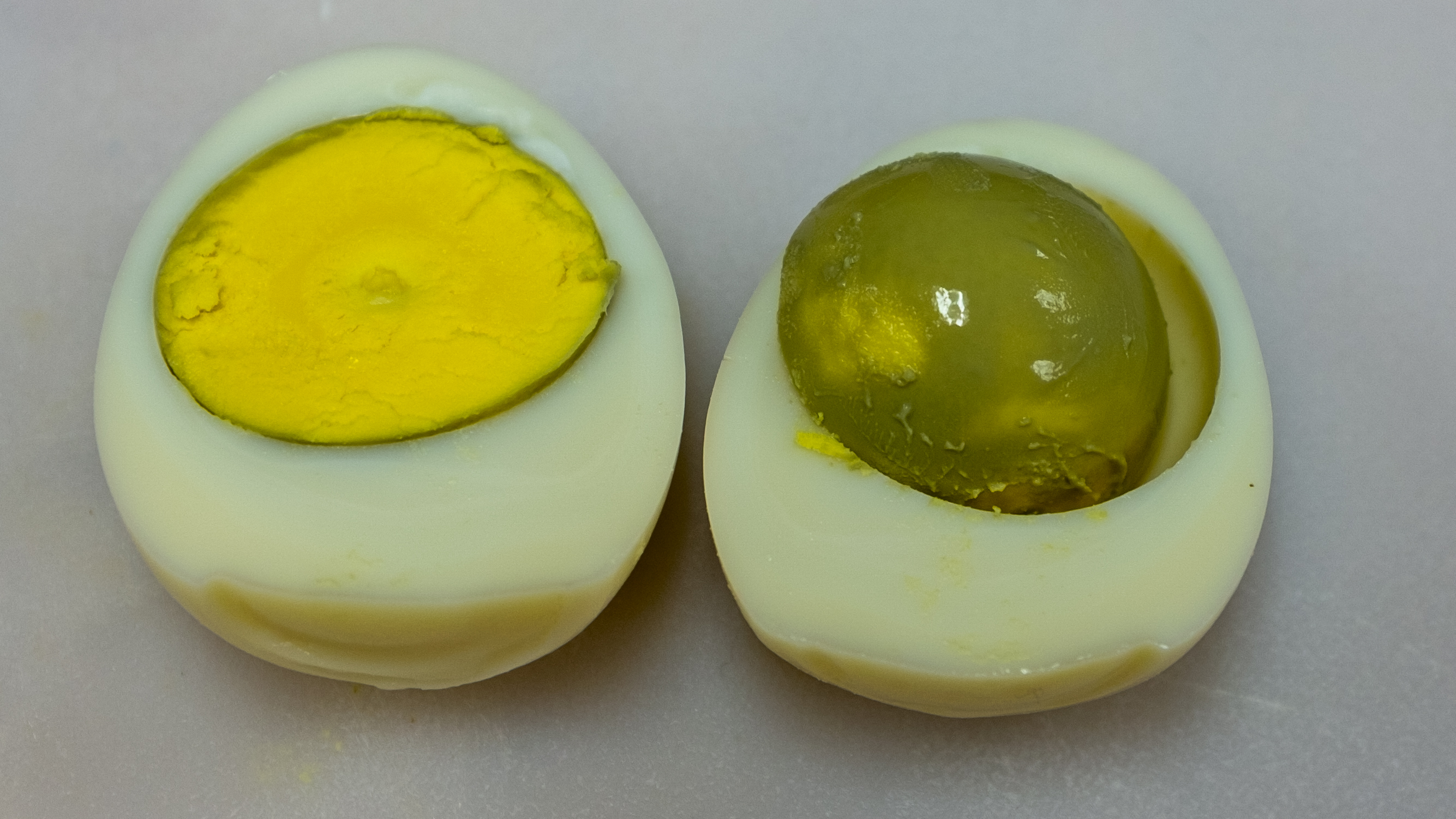
Overcooked egg showing green coating on yolk

There are several techniques for hard-boiling an egg. One method is to bring water to a boil and cook for ten minutes. Another method is to bring the water to a boil, but then remove the pan from the heat and allow eggs to cook in the gradually cooling water. Over-cooking eggs will typically result in a thin green iron(II) sulfide coating on the yolk, though the coating has been reported as having little effect on flavor. This reaction occurs more rapidly in older eggs as the whites are more alkaline. Rinsing or immersing the egg in cold water after boiling is a common method of halting the cooking process to prevent this effect, and in commercial operations the discoloration is removed by immersing peeled eggs in a bath of organic acid after cooking.

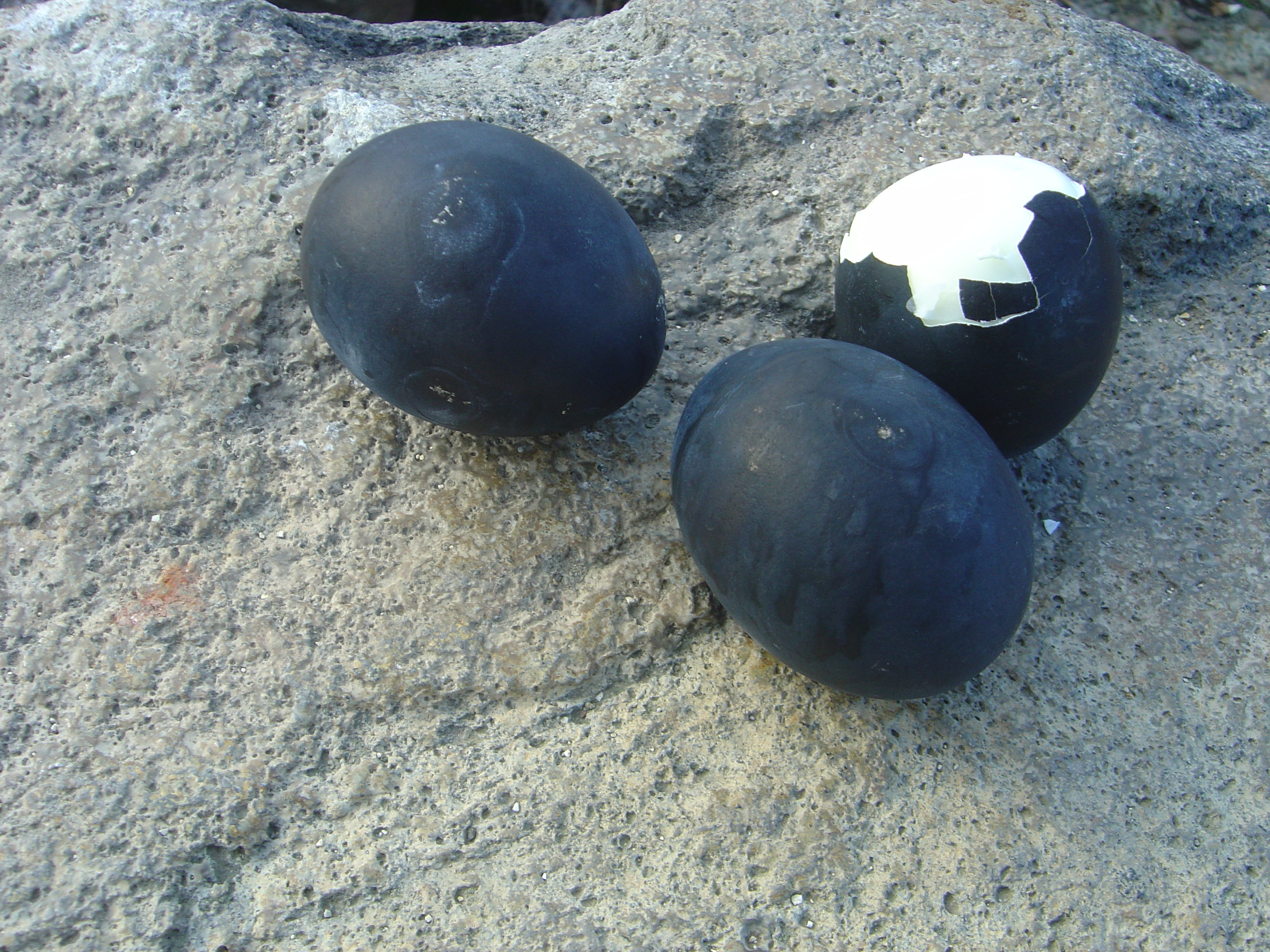
Kuro-tamago, a variety of hard-boiled egg local to Ōwakudani in Kanagawa Prefecture, Japan. The eggs are boiled in the mineral-rich water of the valley's hot springs, resulting in the shells turning a characteristic black color.

Hard-boiled eggs are commonly sliced, particularly for use in sandwiches. For this purpose specialized egg slicers exist, to ease slicing and yield even slices. For consistent slice sizes in food service, several eggs may have their yolk and white separated and poured into a cylindrical mold for stepwise hard-boiling, to produce what is known as a "long egg" or an "egg loaf". Commercial long eggs are produced in Denmark by its inventor Danæg and in Japan by Kenko Mayonnaise. The machine for producing long eggs was first introduced in 1974. In addition to being sliced, long eggs can also be used in their entirety in gala pies.

Haminados, braised eggs slowly cooked overnight, is a traditional Sephardic Jewish dish first documented in medieval Spain and now part of Israeli cuisine, where they are typically served on their own or as part of the Shabbat stew chamin and other dishes.

In Malay weddings across Malaysia, Singapore and Indonesia, boiled eggs are often decorated and given away to guests as tokens of remembrance symbolizing fertility: they may be given as-is called bunga telur ("egg flowers"), or set in a bed of turmeric-dyed glutinous rice known as pulut pahar.

=== Soft-boiled eggs ===
Soft-boiled eggs have a partially liquid yolk, which renders the texture less dry. Soft-boiled yolks also tend to have more of a umami and sweet taste than hard-boiled yolks.

While the traditional egg timer counts to 3 minutes for cooking a soft-boiled egg, some how-to guides recommend longer cooking times ranging from five to six minutes. Chef Heston Blumenthal, after "relentless trials", published a recipe for "the perfect boiled egg", suggesting cooking the egg in water that starts cold and covers the egg by no more than a millimeter, removing the pan from the heat as soon as the water starts to bubble. After six minutes, the egg will be ready.

Soft-boiled eggs are commonly served in egg cups, where the top of the egg is cut off with a knife, spoon, spring-loaded egg topper, or egg scissors, using an egg spoon to scoop the egg out. Other methods include breaking the eggshell by tapping gently around the top of the shell with a spoon. Soft-boiled eggs can be eaten with toast cut into strips, which are then dipped into the runny yolk. In the United Kingdom and Australia, these strips of toast are known as "soldiers".

In Southeast Asia, a variation of soft-boiled eggs known as half-boiled eggs are commonly eaten for breakfast. The major difference is that, instead of the egg being served in an egg cup, it is cracked into a bowl to which dark or light soy sauce and pepper are added. The egg is also cooked for 7 minutes, resulting in a runnier egg instead of the usual gelatin state and is commonly eaten with kaya toast and kopi.

Boiled eggs are also an ingredient in various Filipino dishes, such as embutido and chicken galantina. Boiled or steamed duck eggs that have been incubated for several days are also eaten in the Philippines, Vietnam, Laos, Cambodia, and Thailand as balut.

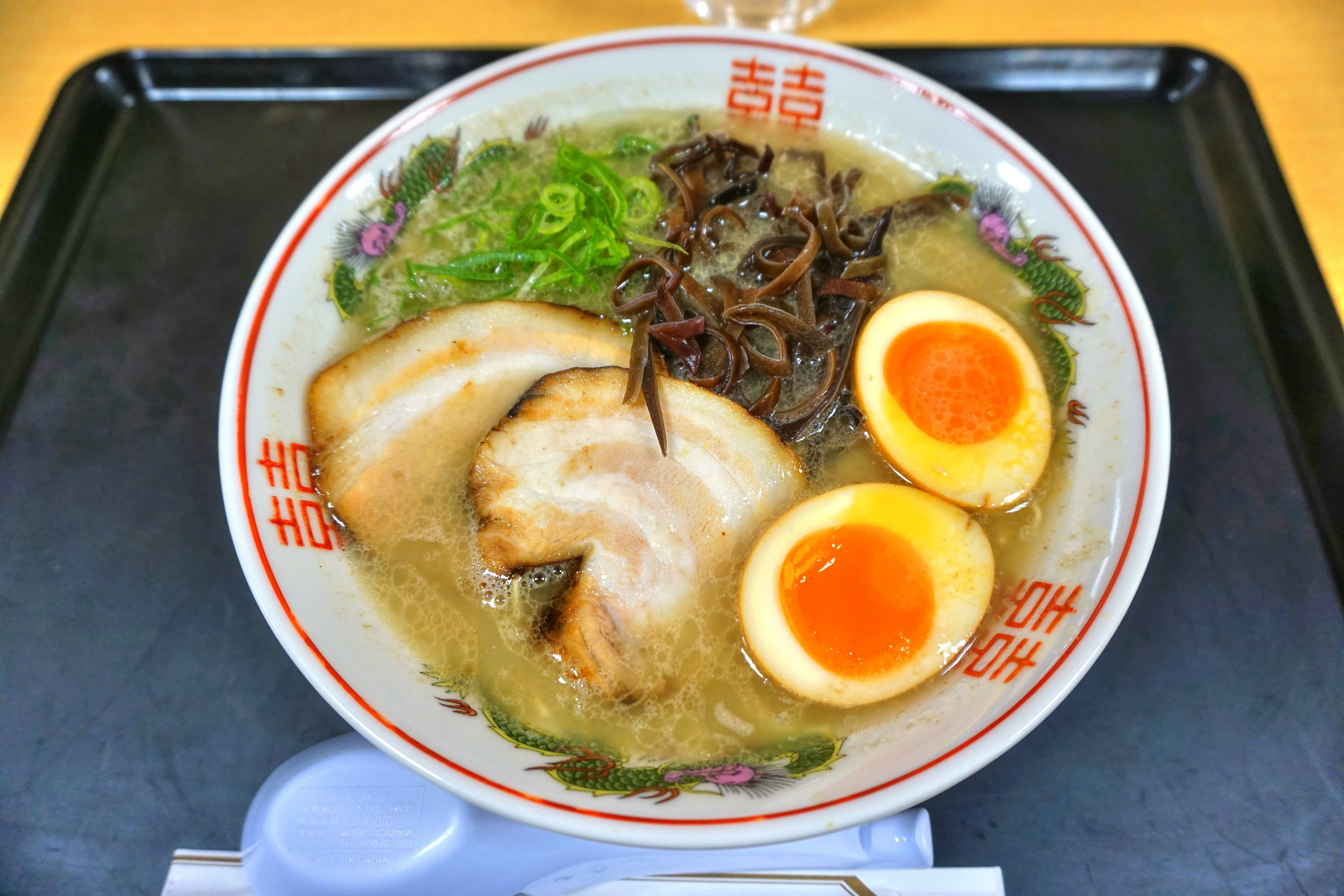
A bowl of ramen topped with a seasoned boiled egg

In Japan, marinated soft-boiled eggs (味付け玉子, ajitsuke tamago) are commonly served alongside ramen. The eggs are typically steeped in a mixture of soy sauce, mirin, and water after being boiled and peeled. This provides the egg a brownish color that would otherwise be absent from boiling and peeling the eggs alone. Once the eggs have finished steeping, they are usually served on top of the soup. Another method of cooking soft-boiled eggs popular in Japan is that of the hot spring boiled egg (温泉玉子, onsen tamago), which is cooked at a constant temperature of 70 °C (158 °F) as is present in hot springs of Japan, producing an egg with solid yolk and sol-like white.

To replicate the texture of soft-boiled egg yolks in microwaved food, Kewpie produces an egg yolk product called kimipuchi (きみぷち), which does not harden when fully cooked. This is achieved by adding various thickeners and gelatin to egg yolk. Kimipuchi is coated with a layer of egg white to resemble soft-boiled eggs in convenience store bento.

=== Other variations ===
==== Methods of heating ====
Steaming
Eggs can be taken straight from the refrigerator and placed in the steamer at full steam. Varying the time spent in the steamer results in different degrees of firmness, similar to boiling.
Baked eggs
Eggs may be cooked to produce a result similar to boiling via baking in an oven by breaking eggs into a muffin tin or individual ramekins.
Sous vide
Boiled eggs can be made by cooking/coddling in their shell "sous vide" in hot water at steady temperatures anywhere from 60 to 85 °C (140 to 185 °F). (Recall from the above that the egg white fully cooks at 85 °C (185 °F) while the yolk thickens at 65 °C (149 °F).)
Periodic cooking
A 2025 paper describes the "optimal cooking" of eggs, exploiting the different rates of heat transfer in the white and the yolk to so that the whites end up firm and the yolk ends up runny. It uses a complicated periodic maneuver transferring the egg between boiling water and warm (35 °C (95 °F)) water.

==== Additional variations ====
Piercing
Some pierce the shell beforehand with an egg piercer to prevent cracking, following recommendations first published by the Poultry and Egg National Board in 1966. The American Egg Board currently recommends against this, as it can introduce bacteria and create hairline cracks in the shell through which bacteria can enter the egg. (Note: The American Egg Board, an industry group, recommends against piercing shells on food safety grounds: "Piercing shells before cooking is not recommended. If not sterile, the piercer or needle can introduce bacteria into the egg. Also, piercing creates hairline cracks in the shell through which bacteria can enter after cooking.", Basic Hard-Cooked Eggs, American Egg Board) A 1975 study showed increased cracking in pierced eggs compared to unpierced eggs.
Salted eggs
In China, eggs (particularly duck eggs) may be preserved by packing them in salt and charcoal or brine. The salted egg is then boiled or steamed prior to consumption. The process is related to century eggs, which are preserved for a long period and are not boiled. The salting or pickling process in a typical salted egg takes 20—50 days.

== Dishes featuring boiled eggs ==
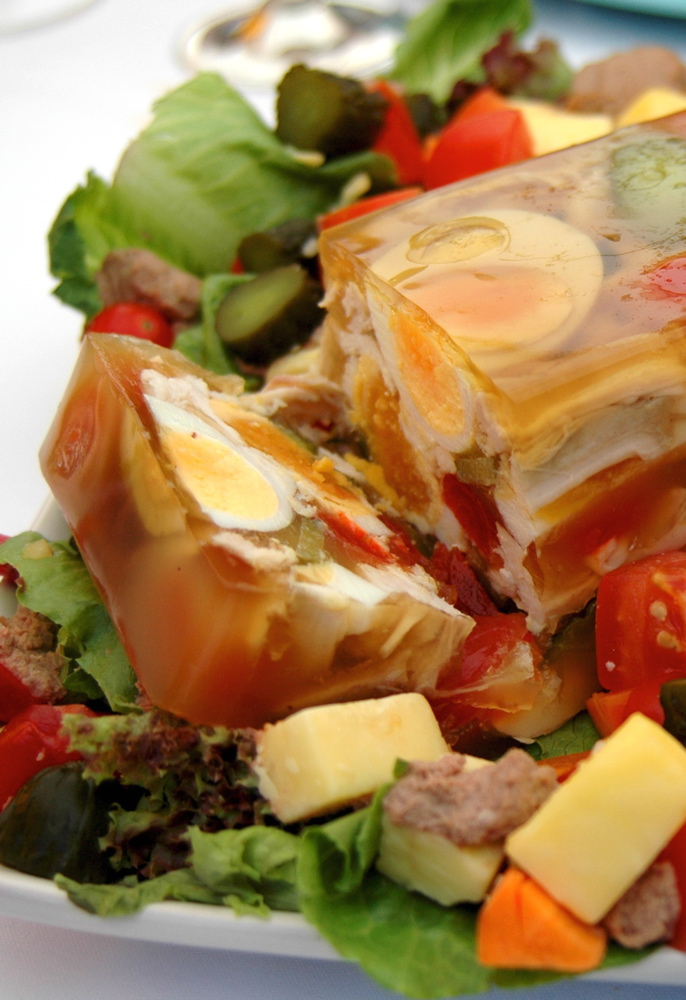
An aspic with chicken and eggs

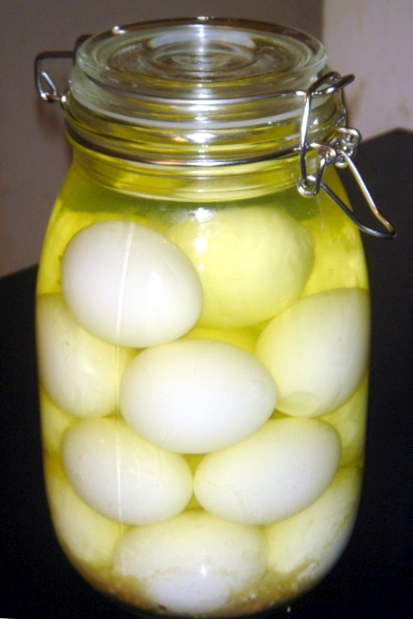
A jar of pickled boiled eggs

Boiled eggs often form part of larger, more elaborate dishes. For example, a boiled egg may garnish a bowl of ramen (often first marinated in soy sauce), be baked into a pie such as a torta pasqualina, or be encased in aspic (similar to the French dish œufs en gelée, which features poached eggs). They may also be chopped and mixed with mayonnaise to form egg salad, or be deep-fried and then baked within a serving of lamprais.

== Peeling ==
Boiled eggs can vary widely in how easy it is to peel away the shells. In general, the fresher an egg before boiling, the more difficult it is to separate the shell cleanly from the egg white. As a fresh egg ages, it gradually loses both moisture and carbon dioxide through pores in the shell; as a consequence, the contents of the egg shrink, it loses protein, and the pH of the albumen becomes more basic. Albumen with higher pH (more basic) is less likely to stick to the egg shell, while pockets of air develop in eggs that have lost significant amounts of moisture, also making eggs easier to peel.

Keeping the cooked eggs soaked in water helps keep the membrane under the shell moist for easy peeling. Peeling the egg under cold running water is an effective method of removing the shell. Starting the cooking in hot water also makes the egg easier to peel.

It is often claimed that steaming eggs in a pressure cooker makes them easier to peel. Double blind testing has failed to show any advantage of pressure cooking over steaming, and has further shown that starting boiling in cold water is counterproductive. Shocking the eggs by rapidly cooling them helped, and cooling them in ice water for 15 minutes or longer gave more successful peeling. Shocking was also found to remove the dimple in the base of the egg caused by the air space.

== Safety ==
=== Cooking to eliminate pathogens ===
There are several foodborne illnesses associated with eggs, most if not all of which are caused by pathogenic bacteria. The harmful bacteria associated with eggs are mostly of the genus Salmonella, but other harmful bacteria that can grow at refrigerated temperatures have been found in retail egg products, such as Bacillus cereus and Staphylococcus aureus. Previous studies indicated that "the complete coagulation of [the] whole egg" was sufficient to destroy Salmonella bacteria, but it is now known that the only factor in the inactivation or destruction of pathogenic bacteria in eggs is temperature. Boiling eggs at a temperature of at least 62 °C (144 °F) for 30 minutes has been shown to inactivate Salmonella bacteria, though the Food and Drug Administration recommends cooking at the higher temperature of 74 °C (165 °F).

Soft-boiled eggs are not recommended by the Food and Drug Administration for people who may be susceptible to salmonella, such as very young children, the elderly, and those with weakened immune systems. To avoid the issue of salmonella, eggs can be pasteurised in shell at 57 °C for an hour and 15 minutes. The eggs can then be soft-boiled as normal.

=== Contamination and storage ===
Bulk hard-boiled eggs have been linked to disease outbreaks such as listeria and S. aureus infections, mainly from contamination and when eggs are not washed in the supply chain.

Hard-boiled eggs are recommended by the United States Department of Agricultural Food Safety and Inspection Service to be used within two hours if kept at room temperature, or within a week if kept refrigerated and in the shell. Shelled hard-boiled eggs sold in bulk are pickled or sealed in an atmosphere of carbon dioxide and nitrogen for preservation.

Ready-to-eat soft-boiled eggs have also been made in bulk, both in refrigerated form and in shelf-stable room temperature form.

== See also ==
- Coddled egg
- Deviled egg
- Egg piercer
- Haminados
- List of egg dishes
- Pickled beet egg
- Tea egg
