= Coddled egg =

Egg lightly cooked in a water bath

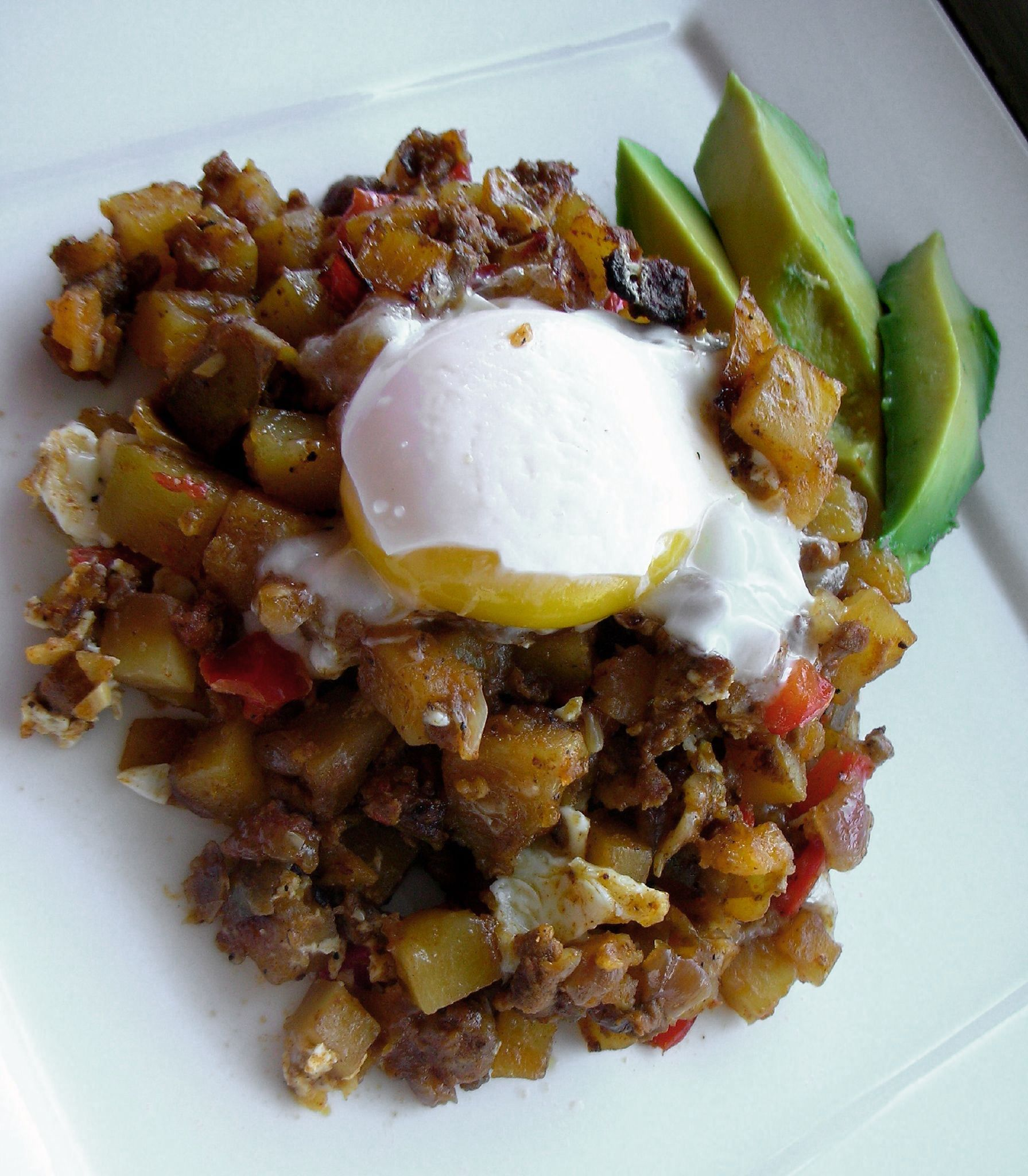
- Coddled egg on hash
- Main ingredients: Eggs

In cooking, coddled eggs are eggs that have been cracked into a ramekin or another small container, placed in a water bath or bain-marie and gently or lightly cooked just below boiling temperature. They can be partially cooked, mostly cooked, or hardly cooked at all (as in the eggs used to make Caesar salad dressing, which are only slightly poached for a thicker end-product). Poached eggs are similar to coddled eggs but cooked by submersion in water, rather than being placed in a water bath.

== Method ==
The egg is broken into an egg coddler, porcelain cup or ramekin with a lid, and cooked using a bain-marie. The inside of the egg coddler is first buttered to flavor the egg and allow it to be removed more easily. A raw egg (sometimes with additional flavorings) is broken into the coddler, which is then placed in a pan of near-boiling water for 7 to 8 minutes to achieve a solid white and runny yolk.

== Manufacture ==
Coddlers may have been manufactured by Royal Worcester since at least the 1890s. Many companies now make egg coddlers, some of which are collector's items.

== Possible risks ==
In the United States, eggs have around a 1 in 30,000 risk of exposure to salmonella and other bacteria. Using fresh eggs that have been washed and kept refrigerated, or pasteurized eggs is recommended to minimize the risk. According to the United States Department of Health and Human Services, eggs should be cooked until both the white and the yolk are firm, and the water temperature should be 74–82 °C (165–180 °F). Children, the elderly, and persons with compromised immune systems are advised against eating lightly cooked eggs because of the risk of exposure to salmonella infection.

In the UK, according to the NHS, raw or lightly cooked eggs bearing the lion mark (indicating that the hens were vaccinated against salmonella) can be safely eaten by pregnant women, infants and children, and the elderly.

== See also ==
- Boiled egg
- Egg cup
- List of egg dishes
