= Court-bouillon =

Broth used for poaching other foods

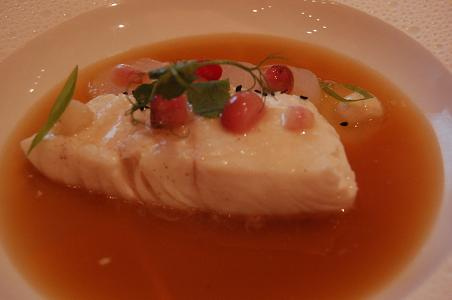
Poached halibut in a sesame court bouillon

Court-bouillon or court bouillon (in Louisiana, pronounced coo-bee-yon) is a quickly-cooked broth used for poaching other foods, most commonly fish or seafood. It is also sometimes used for poaching vegetables, eggs, sweetbreads, cockscombs, and delicate meats. It includes seasonings and salt but lacks animal gelatin.

Court bouillon loosely translates from French as "short broth" because the cooking time is brief in comparison with a rich and complex stock, and generally is not served as part of the finished dish. Because delicate foods do not cook for very long, it is prepared before the foods are added. Typically, cooking times do not exceed 60 minutes.

Although a court bouillon may become the base for a stock or fumet, in traditional terms it is differentiated by the inclusion of acidulating ingredients such as wine, vinegar, or lemon juice. In addition to contributing their own flavor, acids help to draw flavors from the vegetable aromatics during the short preparation time prior to use.

== Types ==
Traditionally, court bouillon is made from water, salt, white wine, vegetable aromatics (mirepoix of carrot, onion, and celery), and flavored with bouquet garni and black pepper.

Court-bouillon need not be elaborate. Court bouillon used to prepare lobster may be as simple as water, salt, lemon juice, and perhaps thyme and bay leaf; that for poached eggs may be salt, water, and vinegar.

In Louisiana Creole and Cajun cuisines, court-bouillon — often spelled "courtbouillon" — refers to a thick, rich fish stew most often prepared with redfish and thickened with roux.

== See also ==
- Nage
