= Panagyurishte-style eggs =

Bulgarian egg dish

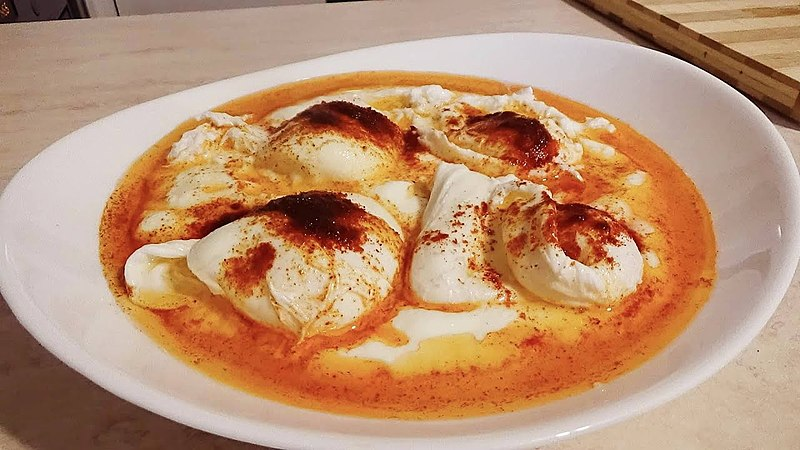
Panagyurishte-style eggs

Panagyurishte-style eggs (in Bulgarian: Яйца по панагюрски) is a popular Bulgarian dish. It is made with poached eggs, Bulgarian yoghurt and sirene, and is eaten warm, often for lunch.

== History ==
The original recipes for this dish are from the town of Panagyurishte, as the name suggests, and are quite different from the modern version. The actual Panagyurishte style eggs recipe was invented in the system of the Balkantourist restaurants, in socialist era Bulgaria. Based on traditional Bulgarian ingredients - sirene and yogurt, it was given that particular name that highlights its folk origin. With time, the dish made its way to the average Bulgarian family's table, and with its easy preparation and great taste became a beloved breakfast or lunch for generations of Bulgarians.

It is also worth mentioning that, in old Balkantourist-era cookbooks, there are two variations of the dish - one where the poached eggs are placed on a bed of crumbled sirene, and the other where the eggs are placed on a bed of yogurt seasoned with garlic paste. With time, the two recipes have apparently merged, and today people mix the crumbled sirene with yogurt.

== Preparation ==
A pot of water is prepared with a pinch of salt and a tablespoon of white wine vinegar added (as colored vinegar might discolor the eggs). The water is brought to a boil and then taken off the heat to cool (to 80 °C, for example) to poach the eggs. There are different poaching techniques such as swirling the water before gently adding an egg in the middle or "bathing" the yolk with a spoon, e.g. After poaching, the eggs are immediately rinsed with cold water in order to stop further cooking and to remove any sourness from the vinegar. Some use boiling water and simply soft-boil the eggs, which is also fine, as long as the yolk is runny. Some sirene is ground or crumbled and mixed with the yogurt.

Garlic paste is added to taste. Chopped garlic, baked garlic, or even garlic powder can be substituted. The butter is melted on the stove. Some paprika is quickly mixed into the butter, and the mixture is immediately taken off the heat, as not to burn the paprika, which will give bitter taste to the dish. Finally, a bed is made from the sirene/yogurt mix, the warm poached eggs are put on top, and are doused with the butter-paprika sauce, after which some paprika might be sprinkled on top for aesthetic reasons.

Ingredients:

- Eggs
- Bulgarian yogurt
- Sirene
- Butter
- Paprika
- Some fresh or powdered garlic
- White wine vinegar
- Fresh parsley or dill (optionally)

== See also ==
- List of egg dishes
- Bulgarian cuisine
- Çılbır (Almost identical Ottoman dish.)
