= Nage (food) =

Broth used for poaching food

Nage is the term (French word) for a flavored liquid used for poaching delicate foods, typically seafood. A traditional nage is a broth flavored with white wine, vegetables, and herbs, in which seafood is poached. The liquid is then reduced and thickened with cream and/or butter.

== Background ==
Cooking something à la nage translates as “while swimming” (French nage) and refers to cooking in a well-flavored court-bouillon. Eventually the term "nage" itself came to refer to a broth which, while light, is strong enough to be served as a light sauce with the dish itself, unlike a court-bouillon which is omitted. Additional ingredients such as tomatoes are sometimes added.

== See also ==
- Demi-glace
