= Egg piercer =

Device used in the cooking of eggs

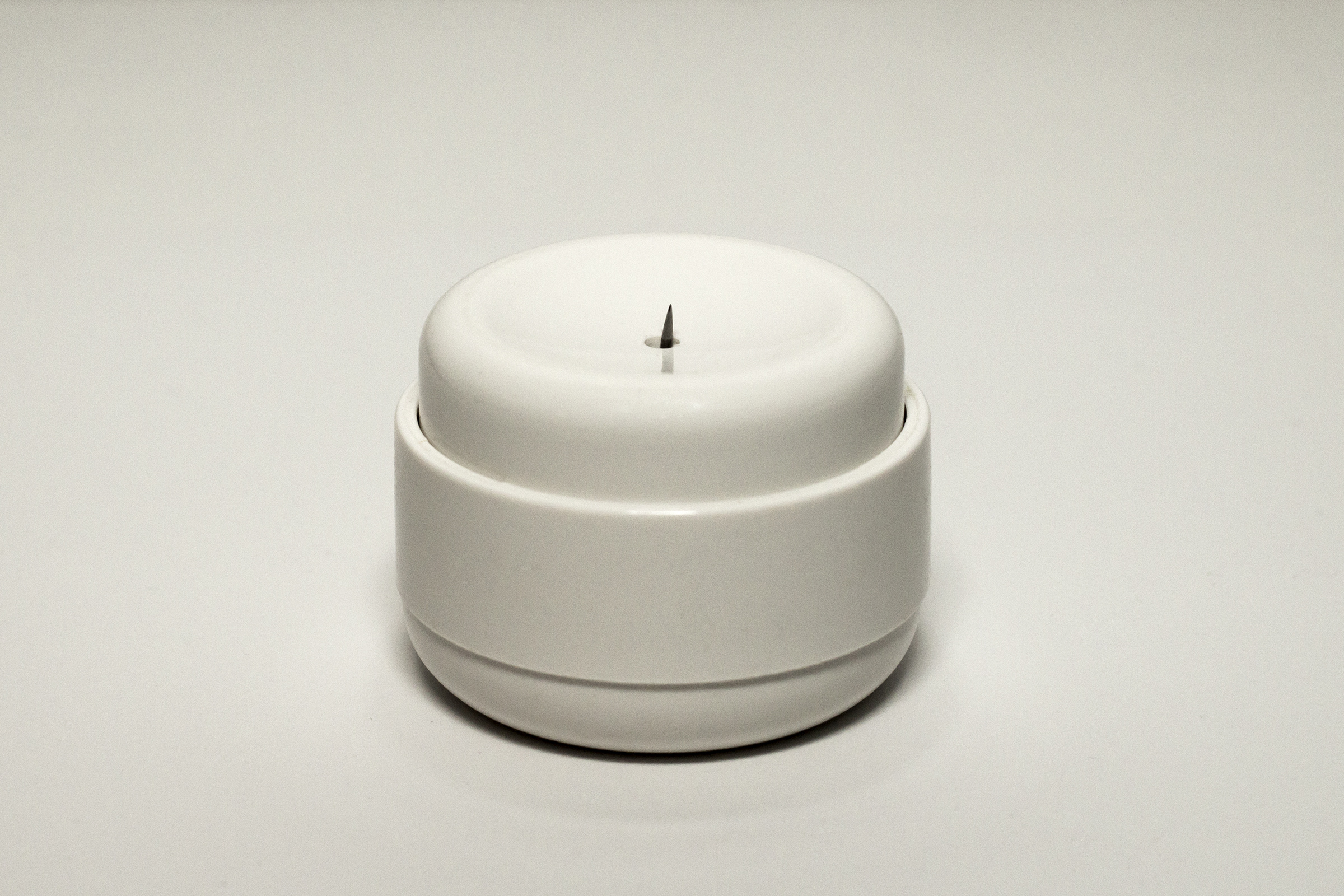
Egg piercer, "push down" variant, pushed down to reveal the pin

An egg piercer pierces the air pocket of an eggshell with a small needle to keep the shell from cracking during boiling.

If both ends of the shell are pierced, the egg can be blown out while preserving the shell (for crafts).

Examples of egg piercers from the 19th century exist.

== See also ==
- List of egg dishes
- Shirred eggs
- Boiled egg
