= Egg cup =

Serving piece for holding boiled eggs

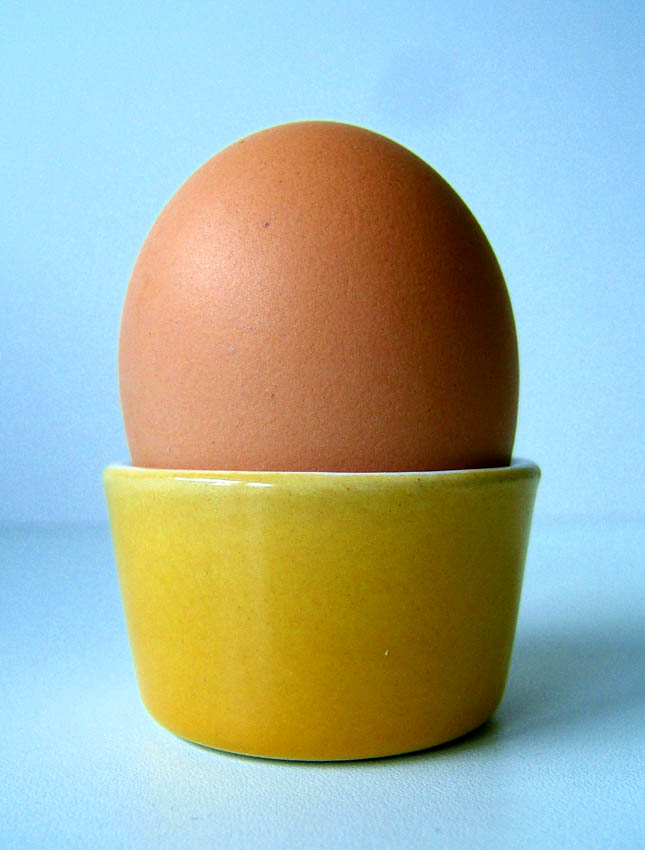
An egg cup

An egg cup or eggcup, sometimes called an egg server, is an item of tableware used for serving and holding boiled eggs within their shell. Egg cups have an upwardly concave portion to hold the egg and a flat-bottomed base. Egg cups can be made from a variety of materials, including bakelite, glass, plastic, porcelain, pottery, various metals, wood, or a combination of two materials, such as ceramic and wood.

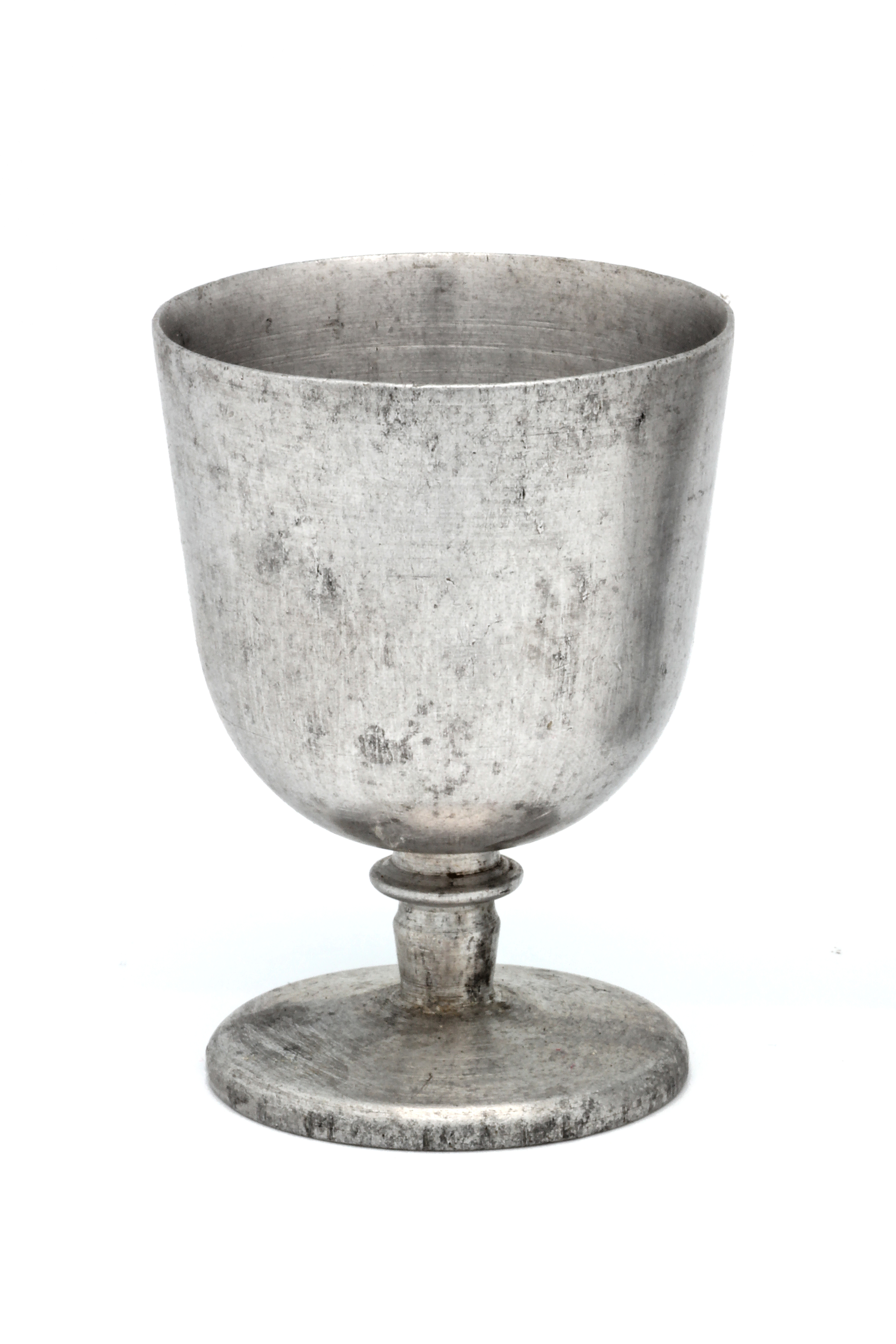
A metal eggcup

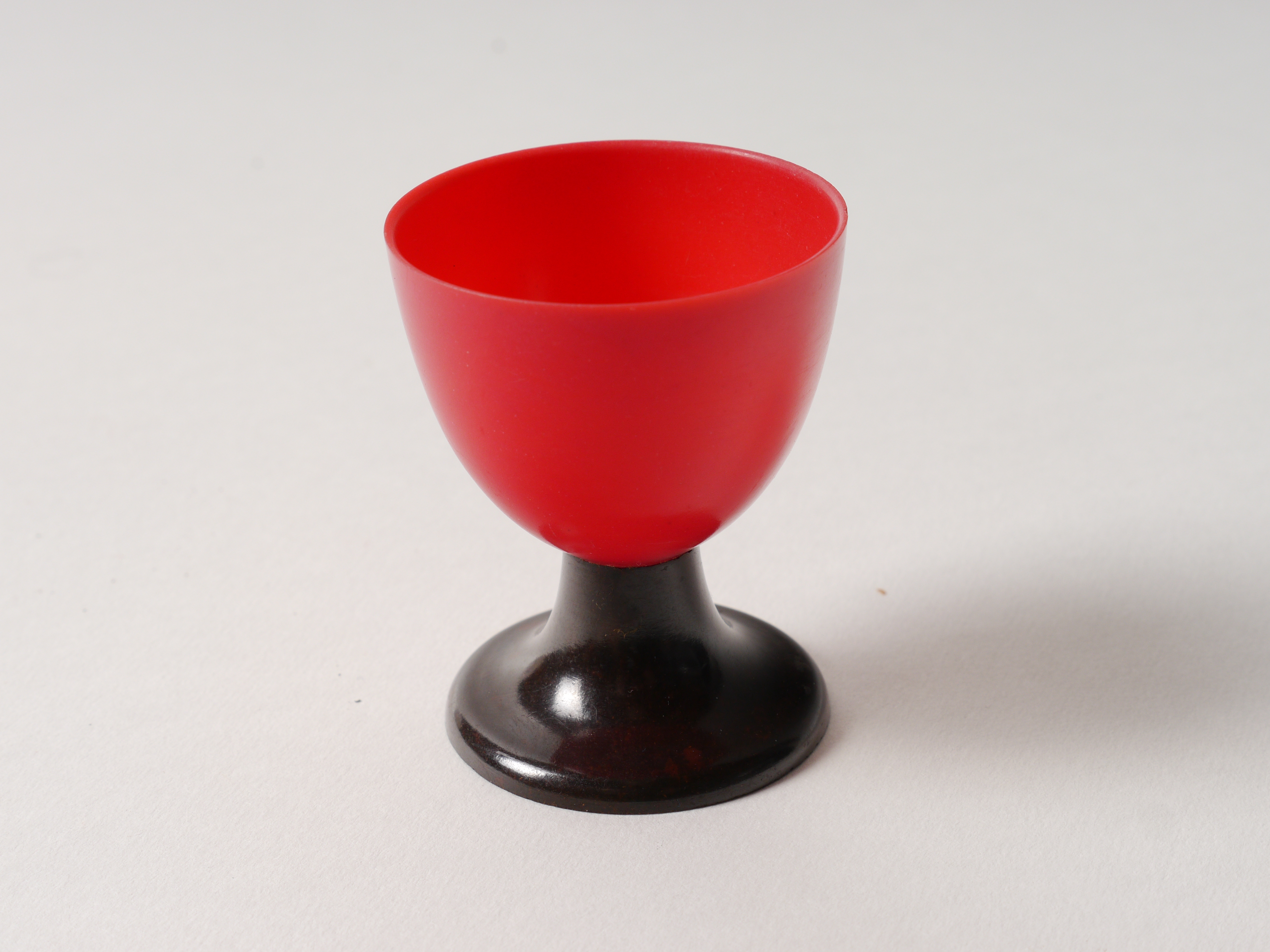
Bakelite eggcup

== History ==
An early silver egg cup was found in the ruins of Pompeii.

== As collector's items ==
Egg cups are collectible items. Collecting egg cups is called pocillovy.

== See also ==
- Coddled egg
