= Çılbır =

Turkish dish of poached eggs

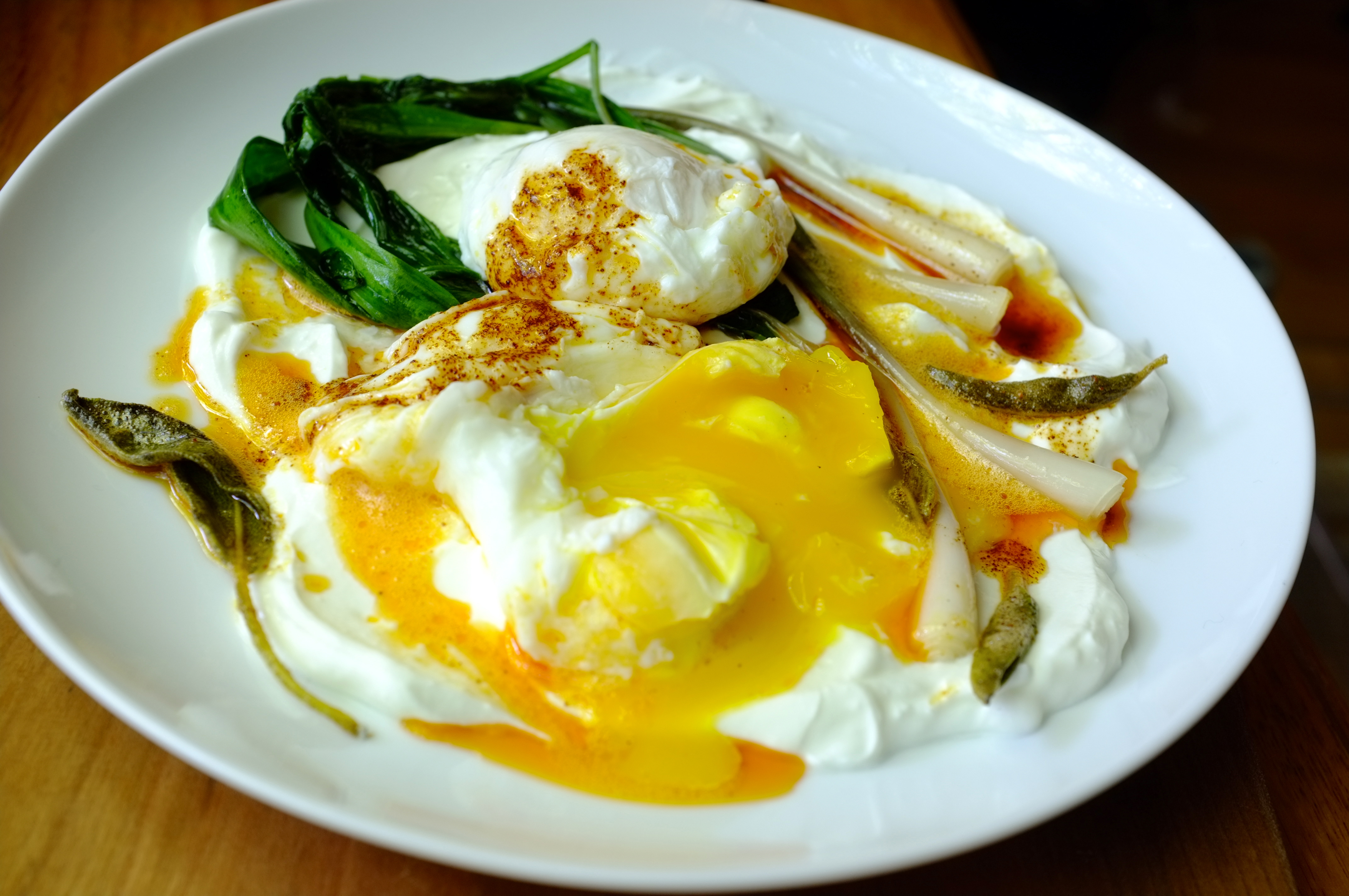
Çılbır with duck-fat sautéed ramps

Çılbır or Turkish Eggs is a Turkish dish of poached eggs with yogurt (often with garlic mixed in).

There are records of çılbır being eaten by Ottoman sultans as far back as the 15th century. It is now common to serve the dish topped with melted butter infused with Aleppo pepper, for which paprika can be substituted.

In several Balkan countries such as Bosnia and Herzegovina, Montenegro and Serbia, the Turkish word çılbır is rendered as čimbur and refers to a dish of fried eggs. Almost identical is the Panagyurski style eggs dish in Bulgaria.

== See also ==
- List of egg dishes
- Turkish cuisine
