= Pasteurization =

Process of preserving foods with heat

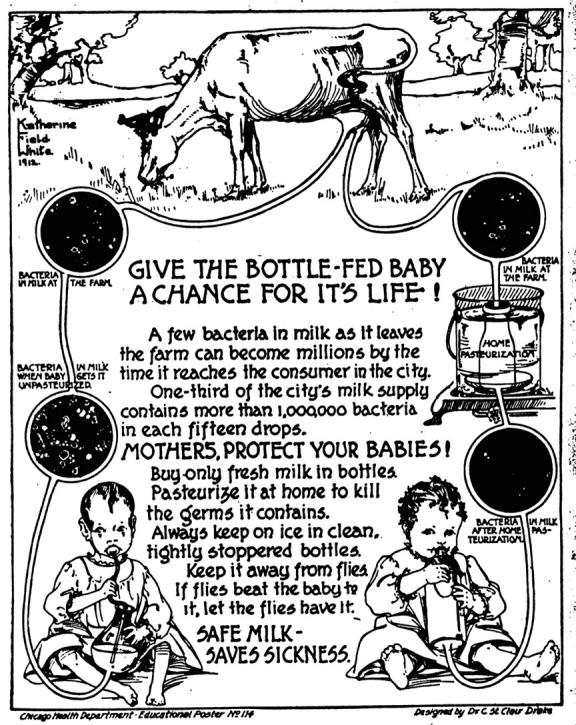
A 1912 Chicago Department of Health poster explains household pasteurization to mothers.

In food processing, pasteurization (-isation) is a process of food preservation in which packaged foods (e.g., milk and fruit juices) are treated with mild heat, usually to less than 100 °C (212 °F), to eliminate pathogens and extend shelf life. Pasteurization either destroys or deactivates microorganisms and enzymes that contribute to food spoilage or the risk of disease, including vegetative bacteria, but most bacterial spores survive the process.

Pasteurization is named after French microbiologist Louis Pasteur, whose research in the 1860s demonstrated that thermal processing would deactivate unwanted microorganisms in wine. Spoilage enzymes are also inactivated during pasteurization. Today, pasteurization is used widely in the dairy industry and other food processing industries for food preservation and food safety.

By the year 1999, most liquid products were heat treated in a continuous system where heat was applied using a heat exchanger or the direct or indirect use of hot water and steam. Due to the mild heat, there are minor changes to the nutritional quality and sensory characteristics of the treated foods. Pascalization or high-pressure processing (HPP) and pulsed electric field (PEF) are non-thermal processes that are also used to pasteurize foods.

== History ==
Louis Pasteur's pasteurization experiment illustrates the fact that the spoilage of liquid was caused by particles in the air rather than the air itself. These experiments were important pieces of evidence for germ theory.

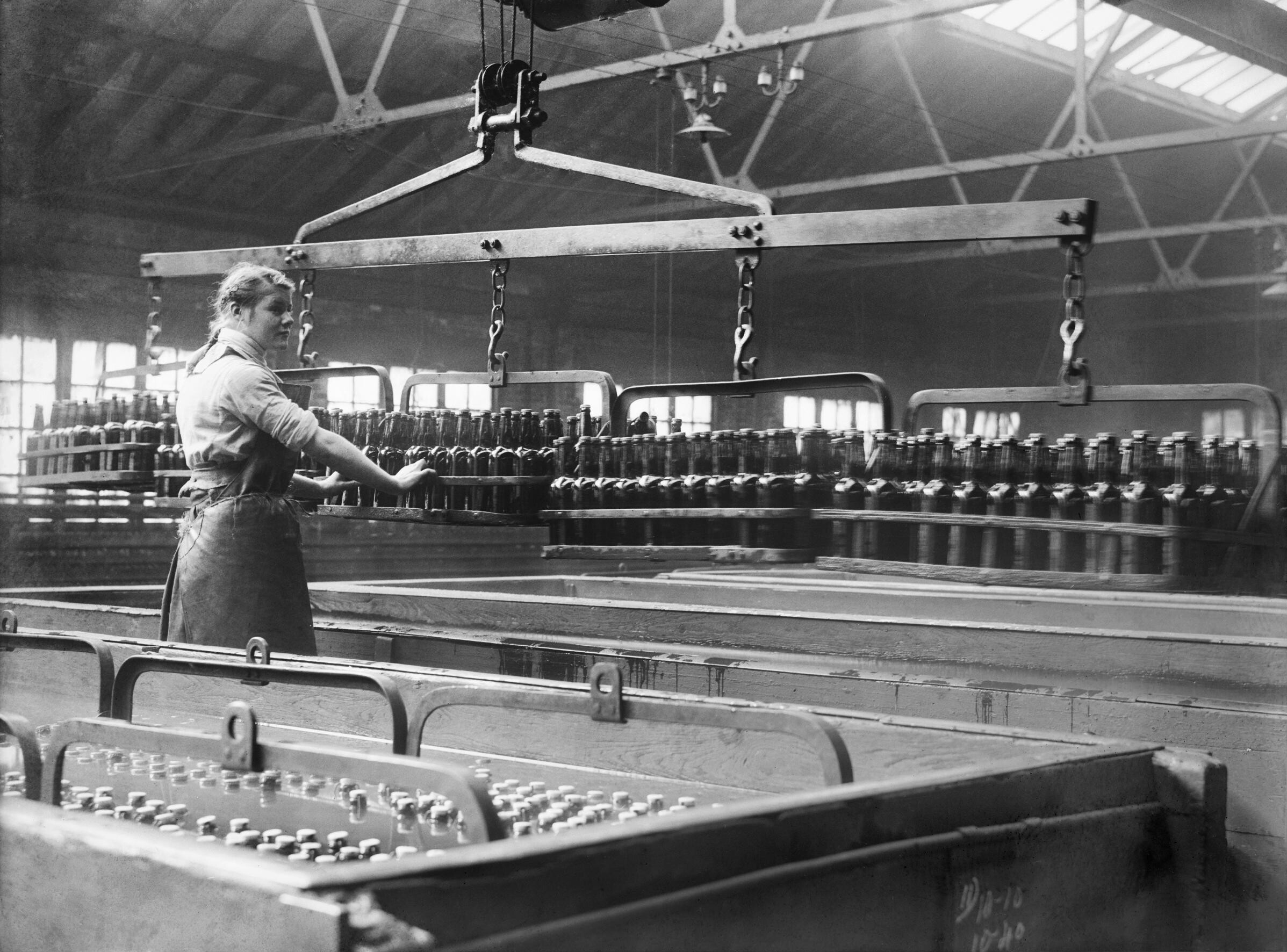
A worker removing beer bottles from a pasteurization tank at a brewery in Cheshire, England (September 1918)

Heating wine for preservation has been known in China since AD 1117 and was documented in Japan in the diary Tamonin-nikki written by a series of monks between 1478 and 1618.

In 1768, research by Italian priest and scientist Lazzaro Spallanzani proved that a product could be made "sterile" after thermal processing. Spallanzani boiled meat broth for one hour, sealed the container immediately after boiling, and noticed that the broth did not spoil and was free from microorganisms. In 1795, a Parisian chef and confectioner named Nicolas Appert began experimenting with ways to preserve foodstuffs, succeeding with soups, vegetables, juices, dairy products, jellies, jams, and syrups. He placed the food in glass jars, sealed them with cork and sealing wax, and placed them in boiling water. In that same year, the French military offered a cash prize of 12,000 francs for a new method to preserve food. After some 14 or 15 years of experimenting, Appert submitted his invention and won the prize in January 1810. Later that year, Appert published L'Art de conserver les substances animales et végétales ("The Art of Preserving Animal and Vegetable Substances"). This was the first cookbook on modern food preservation methods.

La Maison Appert 'The House of Appert', in the town of Massy, near Paris, became the first food-bottling factory in the world, preserving a variety of foods in sealed bottles. Appert filled thick, large-mouthed glass bottles with produce of every description, ranging from beef and fowl to eggs, milk, and prepared dishes. He left air space at the top of the bottle, and the cork would then be sealed firmly in the jar by using a vise. The bottle was then wrapped in canvas to protect it while it was dunked into boiling water and then boiled for as much time as Appert deemed appropriate for cooking the contents thoroughly. Appert patented his method, sometimes called appertisation in his honor.

Appert's method was so simple and workable that it quickly became widespread. In 1810, the British inventor and merchant Peter Durand, also of French origin, patented his method, but this time in a tin can, so creating the modern-day process of canning foods. In 1812, the Englishmen Bryan Donkin and John Hall purchased both patents and began producing preserves. A decade later, Appert's canning method had come to America. Tin can production was not common until the beginning of the 20th century, partly because a hammer and chisel were needed to open cans until the invention of a can opener by Robert Yeates in 1855.

A less aggressive method was developed by French chemist Louis Pasteur during an 1864 summer holiday in Arbois. To remedy the frequent acidity of the local aged wines, he found out experimentally that it is sufficient to heat a young wine to only about 50–60 °C (122–140 °F) for a short time to kill the microbes, and that the wine could subsequently be aged without sacrificing the final quality. In honor of Pasteur, this process is known as pasteurization. Pasteurization was originally used as a way of preventing wine and beer from souring, and it would be many years before milk was pasteurized. In the United States in the 1870s, before milk was regulated, it was common for milk to contain substances intended to mask spoilage.

=== Milk ===
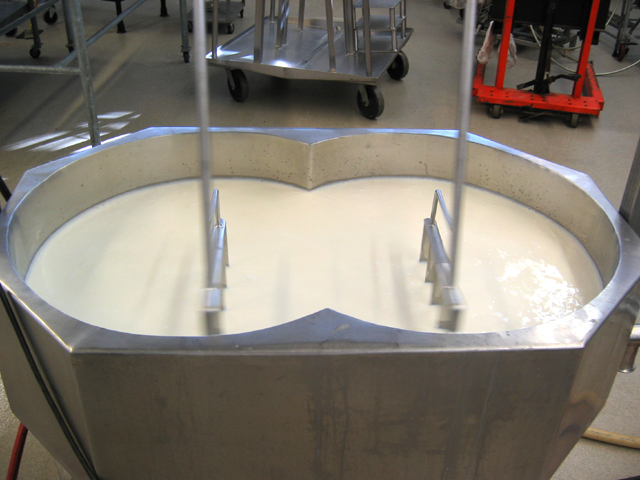
180 kilograms (400 lb) of milk in a cheese vat

Milk is an excellent medium for microbial growth, and when it is stored at ambient temperature, bacteria and other pathogens soon proliferate. The US Centers for Disease Control and Prevention (CDC) says improperly handled raw milk is responsible for nearly three times more hospitalizations than any other food-borne disease source, making it one of the world's most dangerous food products. Diseases prevented by pasteurization include tuberculosis, brucellosis, diphtheria, scarlet fever, and Q-fever; it also kills the harmful bacteria Salmonella, Listeria, Yersinia, Campylobacter, Staphylococcus aureus, and Escherichia coli O157:H7, among others.

Before industrialization, dairy cows were kept in urban areas to limit the time between milk production and consumption, hence the risk of disease transmission via raw milk was reduced. As urban densities increased and supply chains lengthened to the distance from country to city, raw milk (often days old) became recognized as a source of disease. For example, between 1912 and 1937, some 65,000 people died of tuberculosis contracted from consuming milk in England and Wales alone. Because tuberculosis has a long incubation period in humans, it was difficult to link unpasteurized milk consumption with the disease. In 1892, chemist Ernst Lederle experimentally inoculated milk from tuberculosis-diseased cows into guinea pigs, which caused them to develop the disease. In 1910, Lederle, then in the role of Commissioner of Health, introduced mandatory pasteurization of milk in New York City.

Developed countries adopted milk pasteurization to prevent such disease and loss of life, and as a result, milk is now considered a safer food. A traditional form of pasteurization by scalding and straining of cream to increase the keeping qualities of butter was practiced in Great Britain in the 18th century and was introduced to Boston in the British Colonies by 1773, although it was not widely practiced in the United States for the next 20 years. Pasteurization of milk was suggested by Franz von Soxhlet in 1886. In the early 20th century, Milton Joseph Rosenau established standards – i.e. low-temperature, slow heating at 60 °C (140 °F) for 20 minutes – for the pasteurization of milk while at the United States Marine Hospital Service, notably in his publication of The Milk Question (1912). States in the U.S. soon began enacting mandatory dairy pasteurization laws, with the first in 1947, and in 1973 the U.S. federal government required pasteurization of milk used in any interstate commerce.

The shelf life of refrigerated pasteurized milk is greater than that of raw milk. For example, high-temperature, short-time (HTST) pasteurized milk typically has a refrigerated shelf life of two to three weeks, whereas ultra-pasteurized milk can last much longer, sometimes two to three months. When ultra-heat treatment (UHT) is combined with sterile handling and container technology (such as aseptic packaging), it can even be stored non-refrigerated for up to 9 months.

According to the Centers for Disease Control, between 1998 and 2011, 79% of dairy-related disease outbreaks in the United States were due to raw milk or cheese products. They report 148 outbreaks and 2,384 illnesses (with 284 requiring hospitalization), as well as two deaths due to raw milk or cheese products during the same period.

=== Medical equipment ===
Medical equipment, notably respiratory and anesthesia equipment, is often disinfected using hot water, as an alternative to chemical disinfection. The temperature is raised to 70 °C (158 °F) for 30 minutes. More thorough sterilization can be performed at higher temperatures and pressures in an autoclave.

== Pasteurization process ==
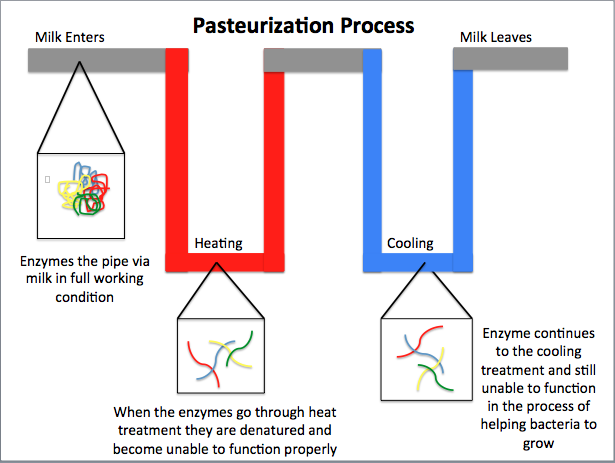
General overview of the pasteurization process. The milk starts at the left and enters the piping with functioning enzymes that, when heat-treated, become denatured and stop functioning. This prevents pathogen growth by stopping the functionality of the cell. The cooling process helps stop the milk from undergoing the Maillard reaction and caramelization.

Pasteurization is a mild heat treatment of liquid foods (both packaged and unpackaged) where products are typically heated to below 100 °C (212 °F). The heat treatment and cooling process are designed to inhibit a phase change in the product. The acidity of the food determines the parameters (time and temperature) of the heat treatment as well as the duration of shelf life. Parameters also take into account nutritional and sensory qualities that are sensitive to heat.

In acidic foods (with pH of 4.6 or less), such as fruit juice and beer, the heat treatments are designed to inactivate enzymes (pectin methylesterase and polygalacturonase in fruit juices) and destroy spoilage microbes (yeast and lactobacillus). Due to the low pH of acidic foods, most pathogens cannot grow. The shelf-life is thereby extended by several weeks. In less acidic foods (with pH greater than 4.6), such as milk and liquid eggs, heat treatments are designed to destroy pathogens and spoilage organisms (yeast and molds). Not all spoilage organisms are destroyed under pasteurization parameters, so subsequent refrigeration is necessary.

High-temperature short-time (HTST) pasteurization, such as that used for milk (71.5 °C (160.7 °F) for 15 seconds) ensures the safety of milk and provides a refrigerated shelf life of approximately two weeks. In ultra-high-temperature (UHT) processing, milk is sterilized at 135 °C (275 °F) for 1–2 seconds. Along with special packaging this extends shelf life to three months without refrigeration.

=== Equipment ===
Food can be pasteurized before or after being packaged into containers. Pasteurization of food in containers generally uses steam or hot water. When food is packaged in glass, hot water is used to avoid cracking the glass from thermal shock. When plastic or metal packaging is used, the risk of thermal shock is low, so steam or hot water is used.

Most liquid foods are pasteurized by using a continuous process that passes the food through a heating zone, a hold tube to keep it at the pasteurization temperature for the desired time, and a cooling zone, after which the product is filled into the package. Plate heat exchangers are often used for low-viscosity products such as animal milk, nut milk, and juices. A plate heat exchanger is composed of many thin vertical stainless steel plates that separate the liquid from the heating or cooling medium.

Shell and tube heat exchangers are often used for the pasteurization of foods that are non-Newtonian fluids, such as dairy products, ketchup, and baby foods. A tube heat exchanger is made up of concentric stainless-steel tubes. Food passes through the inner tube or tubes, while the heating/cooling medium is circulated through the outer tube.

Scraped-surface heat exchangers are a type of shell and tube that contain an inner rotating shaft having spring-loaded blades that serve to scrape away any highly viscous material that accumulates on the wall of the tube.

The benefits of using a heat exchanger to pasteurize foods before packaging, versus pasteurizing foods in containers are:

- Higher uniformity of treatment
- Greater flexibility with regard to the products that can be pasteurized
- Higher heat transfer-efficiency
- Greater throughput with many other processes of using the milk

After being heated in a heat exchanger, the product flows through a hold tube for a set period to achieve the required treatment. If pasteurization temperature or time is not achieved, a flow diversion valve is used to divert the under-processed product back to the raw product tank. If the product is adequately processed, it is cooled in a heat exchanger, then filled.

=== Verification ===
Direct microbiological techniques are the ultimate measurement of pathogen contamination, but these are costly and time-consuming, which means that products have a reduced shelf-life by the time pasteurization is verified.

As a result of the unsuitability of microbiological techniques, milk pasteurization efficacy is typically monitored by checking for the presence of alkaline phosphatase, which is denatured by pasteurization. Destruction of alkaline phosphatase ensures the destruction of common milk pathogens. Therefore, the presence of alkaline phosphatase is an ideal indicator of pasteurization efficacy. For liquid eggs, the effectiveness of the heat treatment is measured by the residual activity of α-amylase.

==== Efficacy against pathogenic bacteria ====
During the early 20th century, there was no robust knowledge of what time and temperature combinations would inactivate pathogenic bacteria in milk, so several different pasteurization standards were in use. By 1943, both HTST pasteurization conditions of 72 °C (162 °F) for 15 seconds, as well as batch pasteurization conditions of 63 °C (145 °F) for 30 minutes, were confirmed by studies of the complete thermal death (as best as could be measured at that time) for a range of pathogenic bacteria in milk. Complete inactivation of Coxiella burnetii (which was thought at the time to cause Q fever by oral ingestion of infected milk) as well as of Mycobacterium tuberculosis (which causes tuberculosis) were later demonstrated. For all practical purposes, these conditions were adequate for destroying almost all yeasts, molds, and common spoilage bacteria and also for ensuring adequate destruction of common pathogenic, heat-resistant organisms. However, the microbiological techniques used until the 1960s did not allow for the actual reduction of bacteria to be enumerated. Demonstration of the extent of inactivation of pathogenic bacteria by milk pasteurization came from a study of surviving bacteria in milk that was heat-treated after being deliberately spiked with high levels of the most heat-resistant strains of the most significant milk-borne pathogens.

The mean log_{10} reductions and temperatures of inactivation of the major milk-borne pathogens during a 15-second treatment are:

- Staphylococcus aureus > 6.7 at 66.5 °C (151.7 °F)
- Yersinia enterocolitica > 6.8 at 62.5 °C (144.5 °F)
- Pathogenic Escherichia coli > 6.8 at 65 °C (149 °F)
- Cronobacter sakazakii > 6.7 at 67.5 °C (153.5 °F)
- Listeria monocytogenes > 6.9 at 65.5 °C (149.9 °F)
- Salmonella ser. Typhimurium > 6.9 at 61.5 °C (142.7 °F)

(A log_{10} reduction between 6 and 7 means that 1 bacterium out of 1 million (10^{6}) to 10 million (10^{7}) bacteria survive the treatment.)

The Codex Alimentarius Code of Hygienic Practice for Milk notes that milk pasteurization is designed to achieve at least a 5 log_{10} reduction of Coxiella burnetii. The Code also notes that: "The minimum pasteurization conditions are those having bactericidal effects equivalent to heating every particle of the milk to 72 °C (162 °F) for 15 seconds (continuous flow pasteurization) or 63 °C (145 °F) for 30 minutes (batch pasteurization)" and that "To ensure that each particle is sufficiently heated, the milk flow in heat exchangers should be turbulent, i.e. the Reynolds number should be sufficiently high". The point about turbulent flow is important because simplistic laboratory studies of heat inactivation that use test tubes, without flow, will have less bacterial inactivation than larger-scale experiments that seek to replicate conditions of commercial pasteurization.

As a precaution, modern HTST pasteurization processes must be designed with flow-rate restriction as well as divert valves which ensure that the milk is heated evenly and that no part of the milk is subject to a shorter time or a lower temperature. It is common for the temperatures to exceed 72 °C (162 °F) by 1.5–2 °C (2.7–3.6 °F).

=== Double pasteurization ===
Pasteurization is not sterilization and does not kill spores. "Double" pasteurization, which involves a secondary heating process, can extend shelf life by killing spores that have germinated.

The acceptance of double pasteurization varies by jurisdiction. In places where it is allowed, milk is initially pasteurized when it is collected from the farm so it does not spoil before processing. Many countries prohibit the labelling of such milk as "pasteurized" but allow it to be marked "thermized", which refers to a lower-temperature process.

== Effects on nutritional and sensory characteristics of foods ==
Because of its mild heat treatment, pasteurization increases the shelf-life by a few days or weeks. This mild heat also means there are only minor changes to heat-labile vitamins in the foods.

=== Milk ===
According to a systematic review and meta-analysis, it was found that pasteurization appeared to reduce concentrations of vitamins B12 and E, but it also increased concentrations of vitamin A. In the same review, there was only limited research regarding how much pasteurization affects A, B12, and E levels. Milk is not considered an important source of vitamins B12 or E in the North American diet, so the effects of pasteurization on the adult daily intake of these vitamins is negligible. Milk is considered an important source of vitamin A, and because pasteurization appears to increase vitamin A concentrations in milk, the effect of milk heat treatment on this vitamin is a not a major public health concern. Results of meta-analyses reveal that pasteurization of milk leads to a significant decrease in vitamin C and folate, but milk is also not an important source of these vitamins. A significant decrease in vitamin B2 concentrations was found after pasteurization. Vitamin B2 is typically found in bovine milk at concentrations of 1.83 mg/liter. Because the recommended daily intake for adults is 1.1 mg/day, milk consumption greatly contributes to the recommended daily intake of this vitamin. Except for B2, pasteurization does not appear to be a concern in diminishing the nutritive value of milk because milk is often not a primary source of these studied vitamins in the North American diet.

=== Sensory effects ===
Pasteurization also has a small but measurable effect on the sensory attributes of the foods that are processed. In fruit juices, pasteurization may result in loss of volatile aroma compounds. Fruit juice products undergo a deaeration process before pasteurization that may be responsible for this loss. Deaeration also minimizes the loss of nutrients like vitamin C and carotene. To prevent the decrease in quality resulting from the loss in volatile compounds, volatile recovery, though costly, can be utilized to produce higher-quality juice products.

Regarding color, the pasteurization process does not have much effect on pigments such as chlorophylls, anthocyanins, and carotenoids in plants and animal tissues. In fruit juices, polyphenol oxidase (PPO) is the main enzyme responsible for causing browning and color changes. This enzyme is deactivated in the deaeration step before pasteurization with the removal of oxygen.

In milk, the color difference between pasteurized and raw milk is related to the homogenization step that takes place before pasteurization. Before pasteurization milk is homogenized to emulsify its fat and water-soluble components, which results in the pasteurized milk having a whiter appearance compared to raw milk. For vegetable products, color degradation is dependent on the temperature conditions and the duration of heating.

Pasteurization may result in some textural loss as a result of enzymatic and non-enzymatic transformations in the structure of pectin if the processing temperatures are too high as a result. With mild heat treatment pasteurization, tissue softening in the vegetables that causes textural loss is not of concern as long as the temperature does not get above 80 °C (176 °F).

== Novel pasteurization methods ==
More broadly, pasteurizing is any method that reduces microbes by an amount (log reduction) equivalent to Pasteur's process. Novel processes, thermal and non-thermal, have been developed to pasteurize foods as a way of reducing the effects on nutritional and sensory characteristics of foods and preventing the degradation of heat-labile nutrients. Pascalization or high pressure processing (HPP), pulsed electric field (PEF), ionising radiation, high pressure pasteurization, UV decontamination, pulsed high intensity light, high intensity laser, pulsed white light, high power ultrasound, oscillating magnetic fields, high voltage arc discharge, and streamer plasma are examples of these non-thermal pasteurization methods that are currently commercially utilized.

== Products that are commonly pasteurized ==
- Beer
- Canned food
- Dairy products
- Eggs
- Milk
- Juices
- Low alcoholic beverages
- Syrups
- Vinegar
- Water
- Wines

== See also ==
- Food irradiation
- Flash pasteurization
- Pascalization
- Homogenization
- Pasteurized eggs
- Solar water disinfection
- Thermoduric bacteria
- Food preservation
- Food storage
- Food microbiology
- Sterilization
- Thermization
- Tyndallization
- Ultra-high-temperature processing
