= Egg spoon =

Kind of spoon

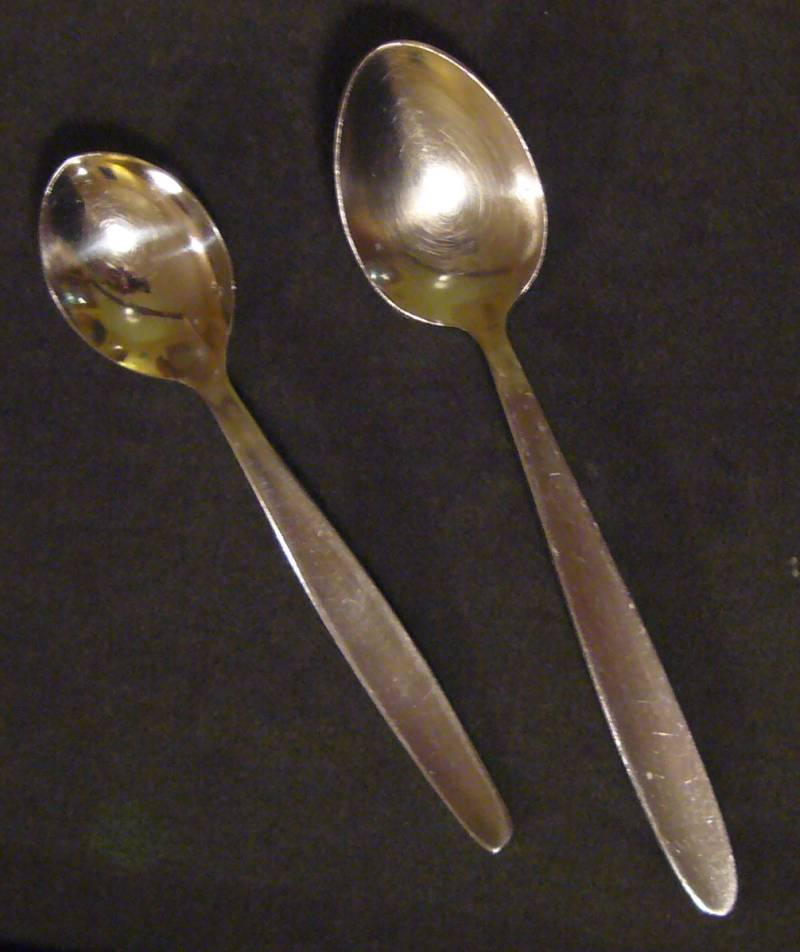
Egg spoons

An egg spoon is a specialized spoon for eating boiled eggs. In comparison to a teaspoon it typically has a shorter handle and bowl, a more pointed tip and often a more rounded bowl. These characteristics are designed to facilitate the removal of an egg's contents from the shell, through a hole in one end. In practice, the advantages of an egg spoon over a teaspoon can be unnoticeable, especially when eating a large egg. In consequence, boiled egg spoons are not common in either modern or antique flatware or cutlery services. Nevertheless, the diminutive size of a boiled egg spoon makes it well suited to small eggs.

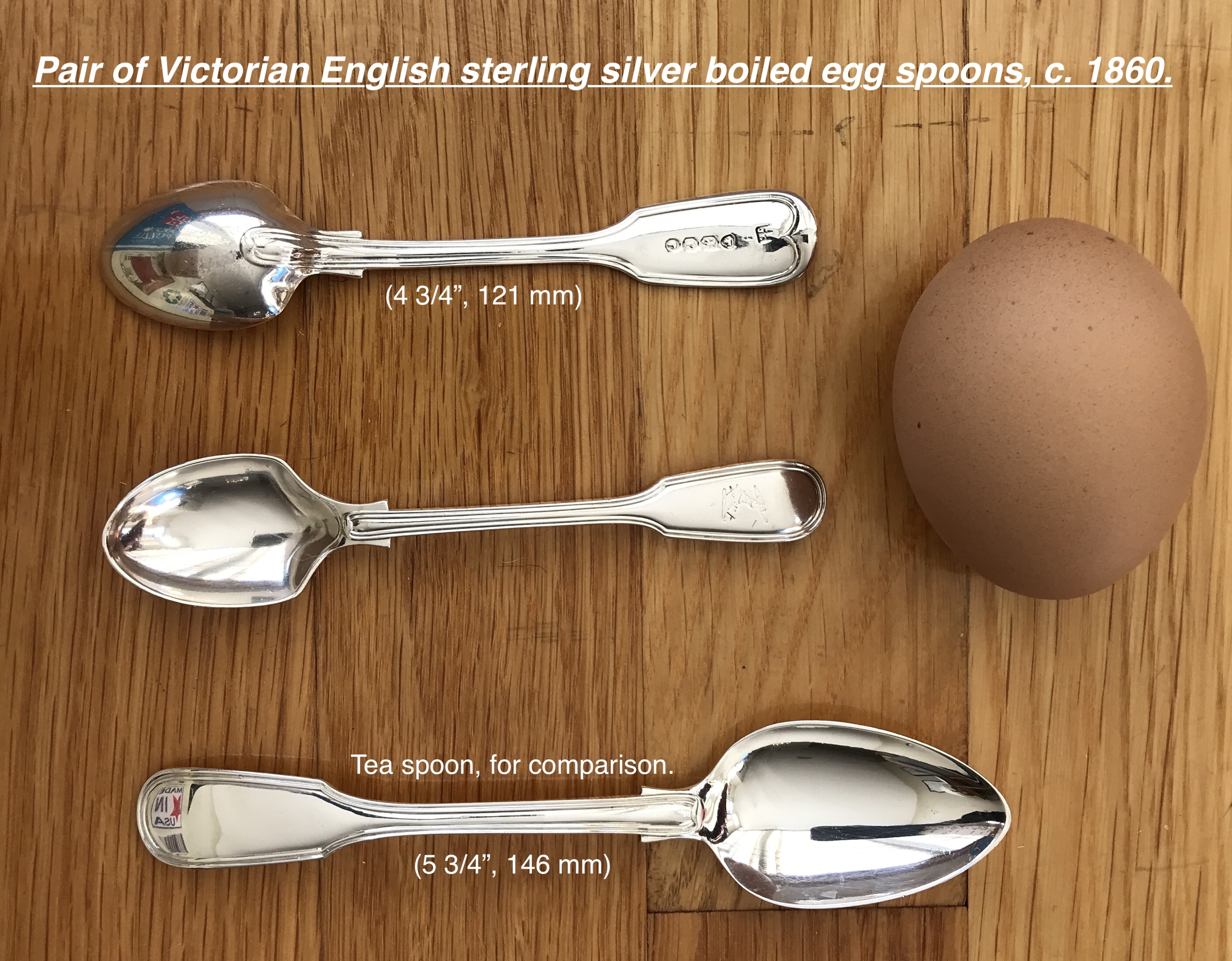
A pair of Victorian English sterling silver boiled egg spoons (front & back), set next to a chicken egg (large) and a typical tea spoon. Boiled egg spoons of the period have an unusual, shouldered shape and are relatively rare.

Because the sulfur in eggs can tarnish silver, high-quality silver egg spoons have a gold wash over the bowl of the spoon. Egg spoons can also be made of horn, porcelain and stainless steel, as well as any other material that does not react to sulfur.

== External sources ==
- Antique Silver Spoons and Canteens - Information, Advice and Sales.
- How silver reacts to eggs.
- See definition of egg spoon having a golden bowl.
