= Food code =

A food code is the organic body and systematized basic standards relating to food, condiments, stimulants and drink and beverages, their concerned raw materials, utensils and equipment use and domestic consumption.

Food codes have as their main goals:

- Define what is meant by food, stimulants, condiments, beverages and other products and materials included in the code.
- Determine the minimum conditions to be met by those.
- Establish the basic conditions of the various procedures for preparation, preservation, packaging, distribution, transport, advertising and consumption.

There is an international code, called the Codex Alimentarius, and regional and national codes. They can also refer to food additive codes, which are most commonly found on a certain part on the label of a product in the ingredients section.

== Food codes by region ==
=== United States ===
The U.S. Food Code is released by the United States Food and Drug Administration (FDA) as a guide or model from which health jurisdictions nationwide can develop their sanitation standards for food service and retail. First published in 1993 and updated every four years (since 2001), the Food Code represents best practices regarding safe food storage, handling, and preparation.

==== Use and content ====
According to the FDA, the Food Code "is a model that assists food control jurisdictions at all levels of government by providing them with a scientifically sound technical and legal basis for regulating the retail and food service segment of the industry (restaurants and grocery stores and institutions such as nursing homes)" and "establishes sound requirements that prevent foodborne illness and injury and eliminates the most important food safety hazards in retail and foodservice facilities."

Contributors to the development of the Food Code are the Centers for Disease Control and Prevention (CDC) of the Department of Health and Human Services and the Food Safety and Inspection Service of the Department of Agriculture. The Conference for Food Protection also provides recommendations for FDA Food Code standards.

Food Code provisions address management and personnel, food, equipment, plumbing, physical facilities, chemical product use, and other areas. The FDA Food Code also includes references, rationales for the standards, and model forms.

==== Adoption ====
As of 2018, California was the only state where no regulatory agency had adopted the FDA Food Code. Which version of the Food Code is used varies by health jurisdiction.
