= Pasteurized eggs =

Packaged eggs pre-processed with medium heat

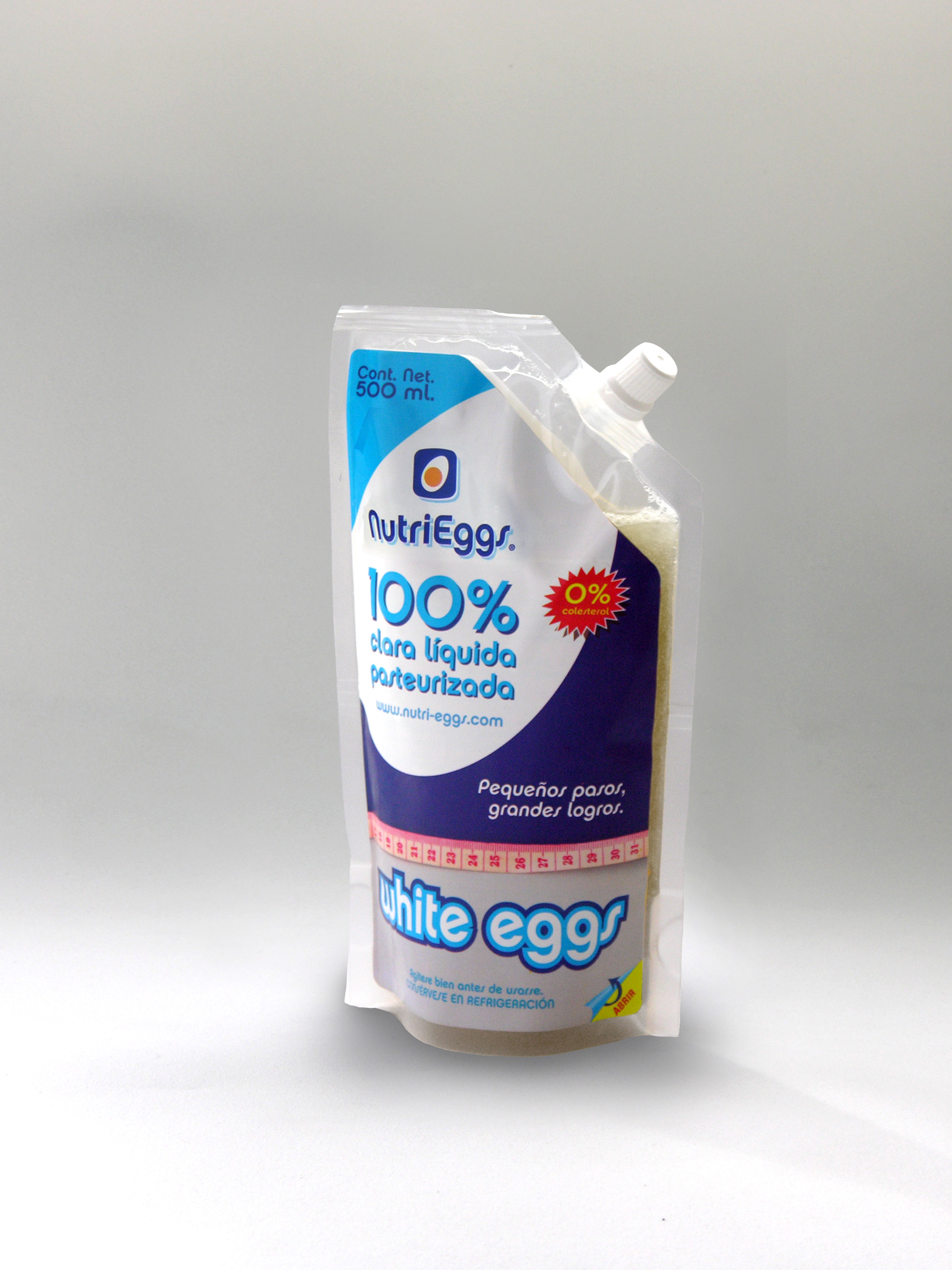
Pasteurized egg whites

Pasteurized eggs are eggs that have been pasteurized in order to reduce the risk of foodborne illness in dishes that are not cooked or are only lightly cooked. They may be sold as liquid egg products or pasteurized in the shell.

== Rationale ==
The 2013 United States Food and Drug Administration Food Code defines regular shell eggs as a potentially hazardous food, i.e., "a food that requires time/temperature control for safety (TCS) to limit pathogenic microorganism growth or toxin formation."

All egg products sold in the U.S that are pasteurized due to the risk of foodborne illnesses are done per U.S. Department of Agriculture rules. They also do not allow any egg products to be sold without going through the process of pasteurization. They also do not recommend eating shell eggs that are raw or undercooked due to the possibility that Salmonella bacteria may be present.

Because of the risk of foodborne illness caused by Salmonella bacteria that may be present in raw eggs, the U.S. Department of Agriculture requires a safe-handling advisory statement on all packages of raw shell eggs that are not treated to destroy Salmonella as follows: "Safe Handling Instructions: To prevent illness from bacteria: Keep eggs refrigerated, cook eggs until yolks are firm, and cook foods containing eggs thoroughly."

=== Salmonellosis ===
The primary risk associated with eggs is foodborne illness caused by Salmonella enteritidis bacteria. Salmonella enteritidis is a dangerous bacterium that can be transferred to humans through ingestion of raw or undercooked eggs. Nearly four out of five Salmonella-related foodborne illness cases share a common vehicle: raw or undercooked shell eggs.

Salmonellosis, the illness that a Salmonella infection causes, is characterized by nausea, vomiting, abdominal cramps, diarrhea, fever, and headache. The onset of its symptoms begins between six hours and 72 hours after the consumption of food contaminated with Salmonella bacteria. As few as 15 bacterial cells can cause foodborne illness.

While the Centers for Disease Control and Prevention estimate there are one million cases of salmonellosis per year in the US leading to 19,000 hospitalizations and 380 deaths, the U.S. Food and Drug Administration (FDA) estimates that only 79,000 cases each year are the result of consuming eggs contaminated with Salmonella, of which only 30 result in death.

In Europe, all hens are required to be vaccinated against salmonellosis. Eggs are not washed (and, in some countries, not refrigerated) since condensation could lead to salmonellosis contamination. In the US, it is important to keep eggs refrigerated since not all hens are vaccinated.

=== Avian flu virus ===
The process of pasteurizing eggs also destroys avian flu virus.

=== Food code compliance ===
The 2013 FDA Food Code states that in serving highly susceptible populations (preschool age children; older adults; individuals with compromised immune systems; and individuals who receive meals through custodial care-giving environments such as child or adult day care centers, kidney dialysis centers, hospitals, or nursing homes):

Pasteurized eggs or egg products shall be substituted for raw eggs in the preparation of Foods such as Caesar salad, hollandaise or Béarnaise sauce, mayonnaise, meringue, eggnog, ice cream, egg-fortified beverages and recipes in which more than one egg is broken and the eggs are combined.

The FDA Food Code has gained adoption by health jurisdictions throughout the U.S.

== Products ==
As distinct from whole shell eggs, "egg products" are defined by the U.S. Department of Agriculture (USDA) as "eggs that are removed from their shells for processing." The processing of egg products includes breaking eggs, filtering, mixing, stabilizing, blending, pasteurizing, cooling, freezing or drying, and packaging. This is done at USDA-inspected plants.

Egg products include whole eggs, whites, yolks and various blends with or without non-egg ingredients that are processed and pasteurized and may be available in liquid, frozen, and dried forms. This is achieved by heating the products to a specified temperature for a specified period.

Pre-separated egg and whole egg products may be used in commercial cooking and baking for saving time or for reducing food waste. In addition, the "potentially hazardous" designation for shell eggs does not apply.

== Pasteurized shell eggs ==
According to the U.S. Department of Agriculture, in-shell pasteurized eggs may be used safely without cooking. For example, they may safely be consumed raw (as in raw cookie dough or eggnog) or in undercooked forms (such as a sunny-side up egg). Many food service and health care providers use these eggs to prevent cross-contamination in their kitchens.

=== History ===
By traditional pasteurization methods, heating a raw shell egg to a high enough temperature to achieve pasteurization would also cook the egg. However, beginning in the early 1980s, Dr. James P. Cox and R.W. Duffy Cox of Lynden, Washington, began developing methods to pasteurize shell eggs.

In the early 1990s, the Coxes were introduced to L. John Davidson. Davidson recognized the market need and opportunity for a safer egg option for consumers and food operations around the country. Davidson acquired a license agreement on the technology from the Cox Family and formed Pasteurized Egg Corporation to introduce safe egg technology to the consumer marketplace.

The process for pasteurizing shell eggs has been patented. Currently, National Pasteurized Eggs Inc. of Lansing, Illinois, owns Dr. Cox's patent to the pasteurization process. Only National Pasteurized Eggs Inc. can provide pasteurized shell eggs produced through these patented processes. The eggs can be found in all U.S. states under the brand Davidson's Safest Choice, introduced in 2003.

=== Process ===
Pasteurizing eggs in their shells is achieved through a technique that uses precise time and temperature zones within water baths. Pasteurizing eggs in their shells can also be achieved through a process that involves treatment with ozone and reactive oxygen species under high and low pressures, followed by replacement with an inert gas, such as nitrogen.

Currently, shell eggs pasteurized using the heating technique are the only commercially available pasteurized eggs. According to the U.S. Department of Agriculture,

Shell eggs can be pasteurized by a processor if FDA accepted the process for the destruction of Salmonella. Pasteurized shell eggs are now available at some grocery stores and must be kept refrigerated to retain quality. The equipment to pasteurize shell eggs isn't available for home use, and it is very difficult to pasteurize shell eggs at home without cooking the contents of the egg.

After pasteurization, the eggs are coated with food-grade wax to maintain freshness and prevent environmental contamination and stamped with a blue or red "P" in a circle to distinguish them from unpasteurized eggs.

=== Quality ===
Opinion on the quality of pasteurized shell eggs is mixed, and sometimes depends on whether comparisons involve experimental processes or products that are actually on the market. Taste tests noted deficiencies in pasteurized shell eggs experimentally produced via a microwaved pasteurization process (not for commercially available pasteurized shell eggs). Using commercially available pasteurized shell eggs, a San Francisco Chronicle reporter noted a "slight chemical taste" for pasteurized shell eggs.

Relish magazine states that pasteurized shell eggs "look like real eggs, act like real eggs and taste like real eggs." "Independent taste tests conducted in Good Housekeeping kitchens have not been able to tell any differences between raw and pasteurized eggs," according to Food Safety News, and in two out of three tastings a Chicago Tribune reporter preferred pasteurized eggs flavor over farmers market eggs. According to International Business Times, demand for pasteurized shell eggs within the food service industry is strong because, as of 2008, "states such as California, Iowa, Michigan, Wisconsin and Illinois have adopted the most recent FDA Food Code, in which pasteurized shell eggs shall be substituted for raw eggs to at-risk groups."

=== Exemption ===
The FDA Food Code exempts pasteurized shell eggs from the definition of "time/temperature control for safe food." requirement to carry a safe handling advisory statement.

The U.S. Department of Agriculture also states, "In-shell pasteurized eggs may be used safely without cooking."

== See also ==
- Pasteurization
- Powdered eggs
