= Poached egg =

Egg cooked in relatively low-heat water

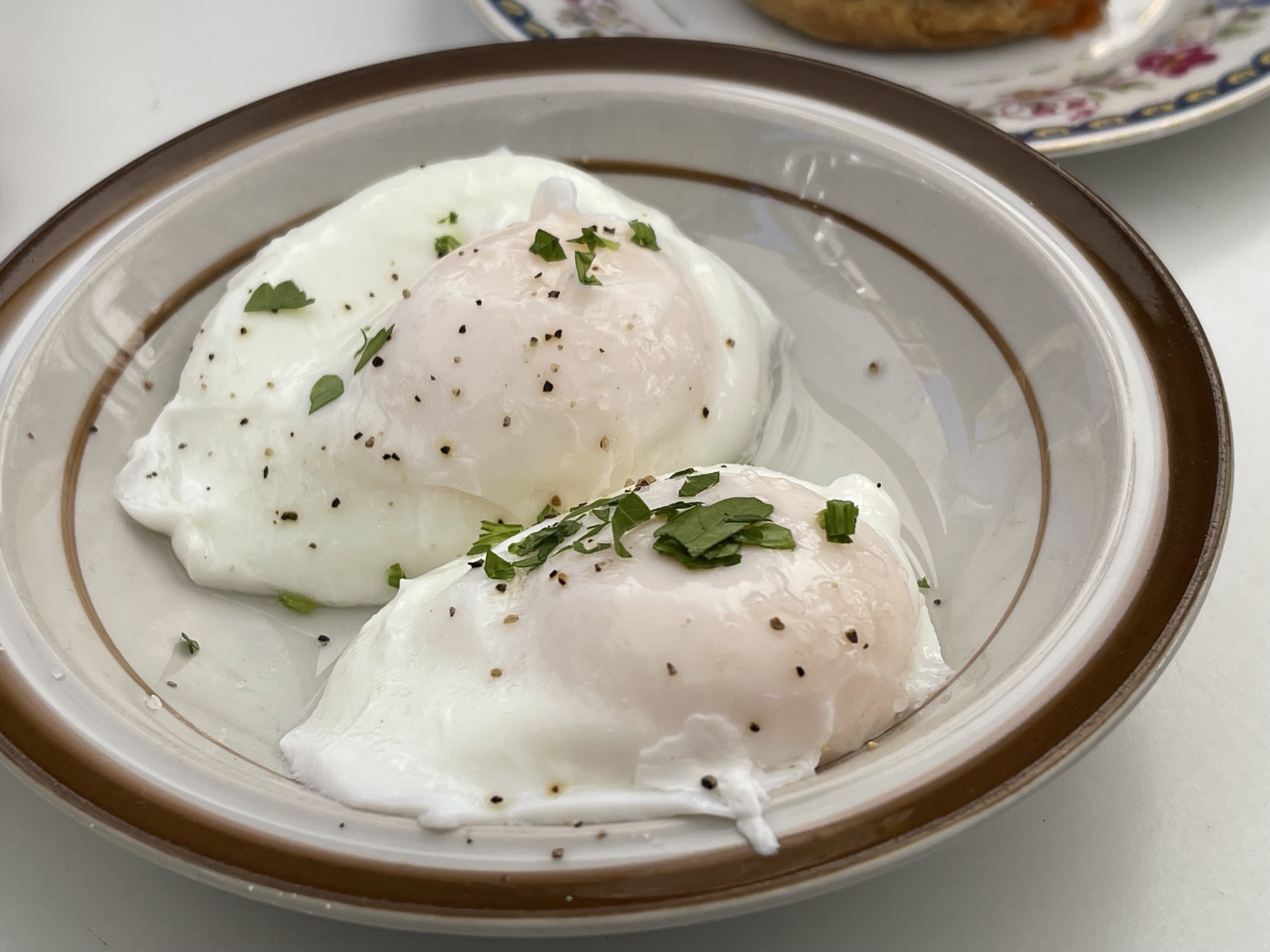
- Poached eggs
- Main ingredients: Eggs

A poached egg is an egg that has been cooked outside the shell by poaching (or sometimes steaming). This method of preparation can yield more delicately cooked eggs than higher temperature methods such as boiling. Poached eggs can be found in several dishes.

== Preparation ==
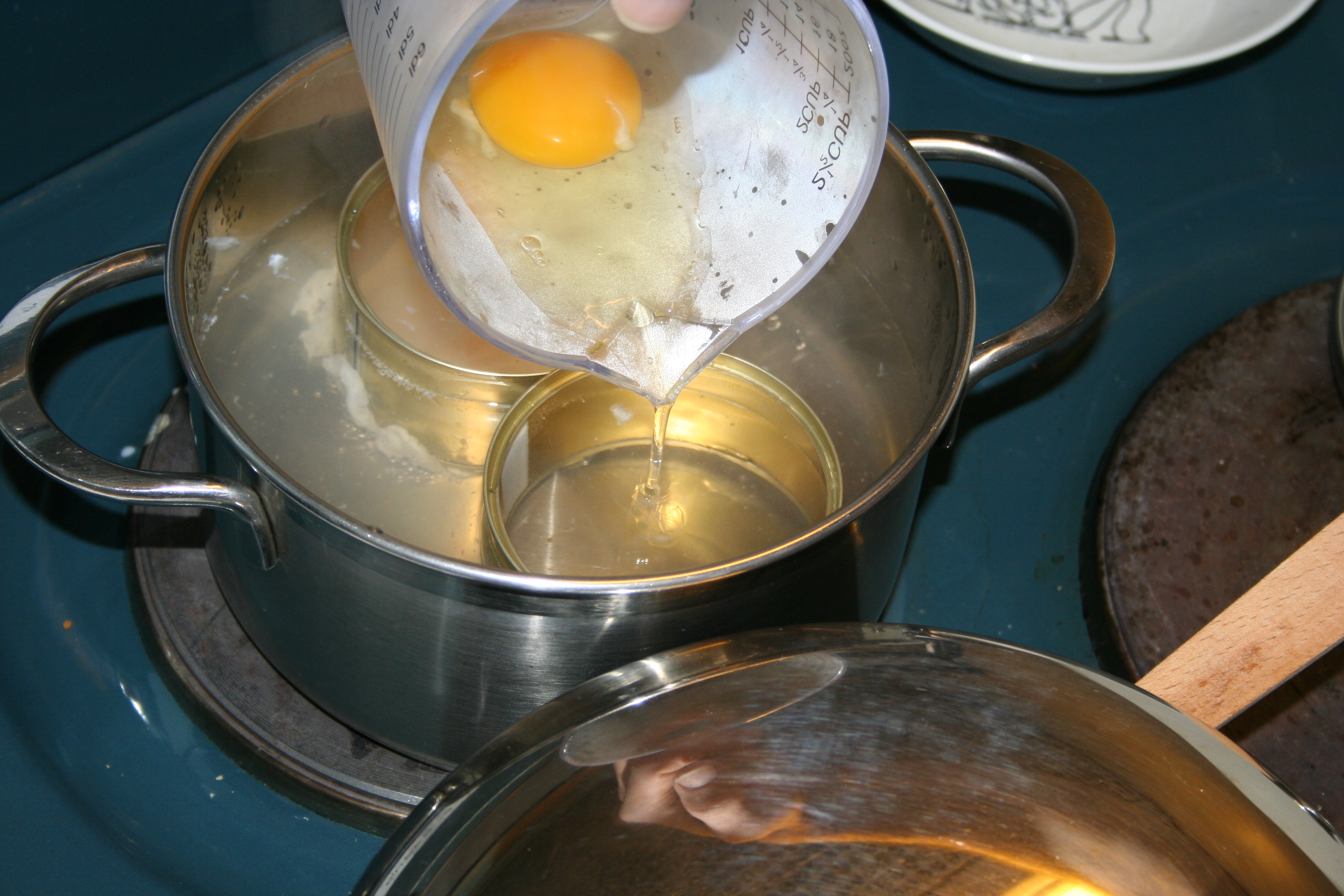
An egg being slowly poured into a ring mould in a pot of simmering water

The egg is cracked into a cup or bowl of any size, and then gently slid into a pan of water at approximately 62 °C (144 °F) and cooked until the egg white has mostly solidified, but the yolk remains soft. The ideal poached egg has a runny yolk, with a hardening crust and no raw white remaining. In countries that mandate universal salmonella vaccination for hens, eating eggs with a runny yolk is considered safe.

Broken into the water at the poaching temperature, the white will cling to the yolk, resulting in cooked egg white and runny yolk.

A chicken egg contains some egg white that may disperse into the poaching liquid and cook into an undesirable foam. To prevent this, the egg can be strained before cooking to remove the thinner component of the egg white. A small amount of vinegar may also be added to the water, as its acidic qualities accelerate poaching. Stirring the water vigorously to create a vortex may also reduce dispersion.

== Steamed ==
The term "poaching" is often used for this cooking method but it is actually incorrect, as this method is closer to "coddling".

The egg is placed in a cup and suspended over simmering water, using a special pan called an "egg-poacher". This is usually a wide-bottomed pan with an inner lid, with holes containing several circular cups that each hold one egg, and an additional lid over the top. To cook the eggs, the pan is filled with water and brought to a simmer or a gentle boil. The outer lid holds in the steam, ensuring that the heat surrounds the egg completely. The cups are often buttered so that the cooked eggs may be removed easily.

The resulting steamed eggs are similar to coddled eggs, although steamed eggs are often cooked longer, hence tend to be firmer in texture. Eggs prepared this way are often served on buttered toast.

Steamed eggs are often made in a home environment in place of poached eggs, as it is easier to obtain consistent results with this alternative method. However, poached eggs remain the preference of professional kitchens, as it is easier to cook in larger quantities, and no additional equipment or appliance is needed to do so.

== Dishes with poached eggs ==
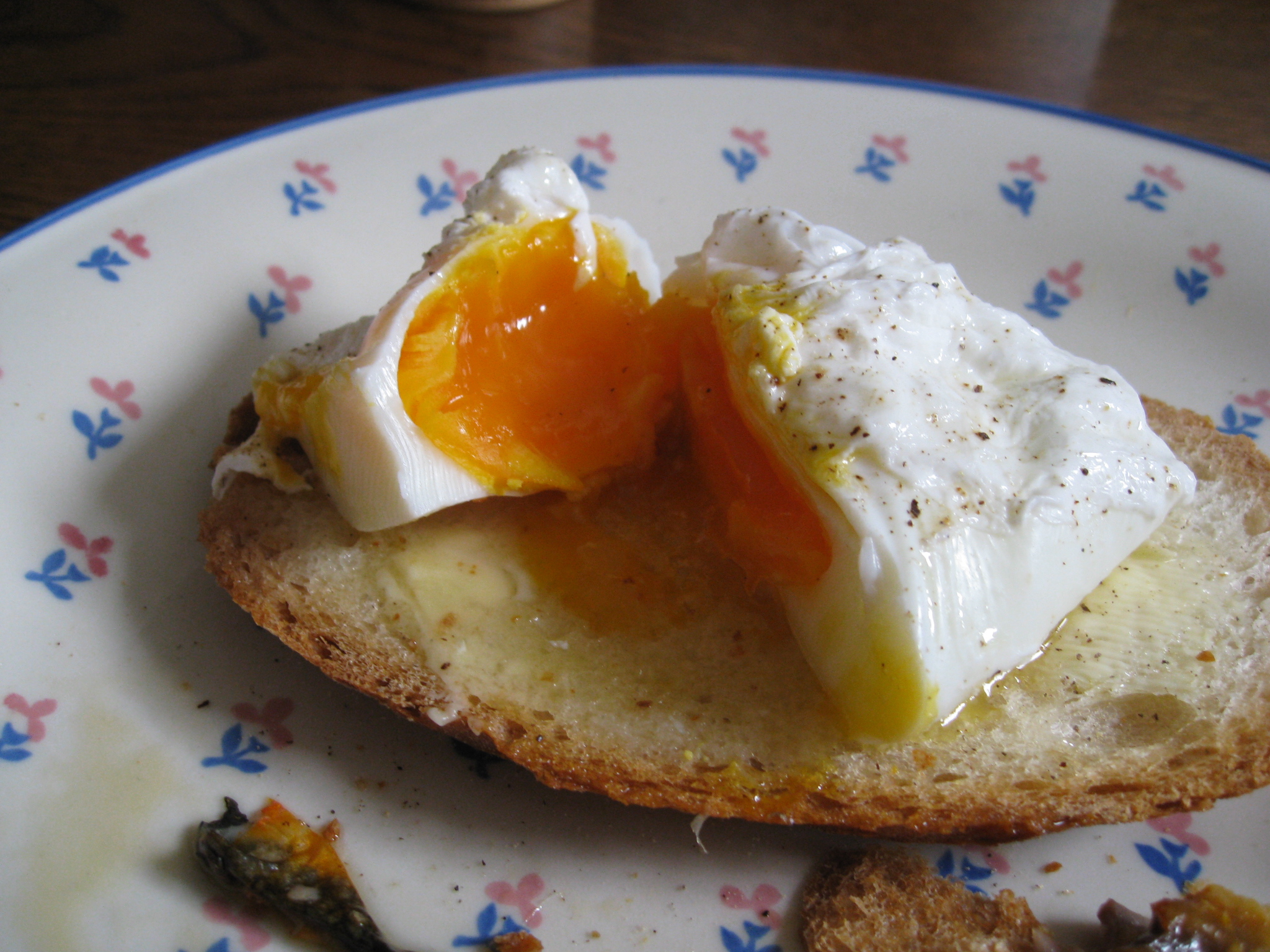
A runny poached egg cut in half on bread

Poached eggs are used in the traditional American breakfast dish (eggs Benedict), and similar dishes such as eggs Florentine and eggs Mornay.

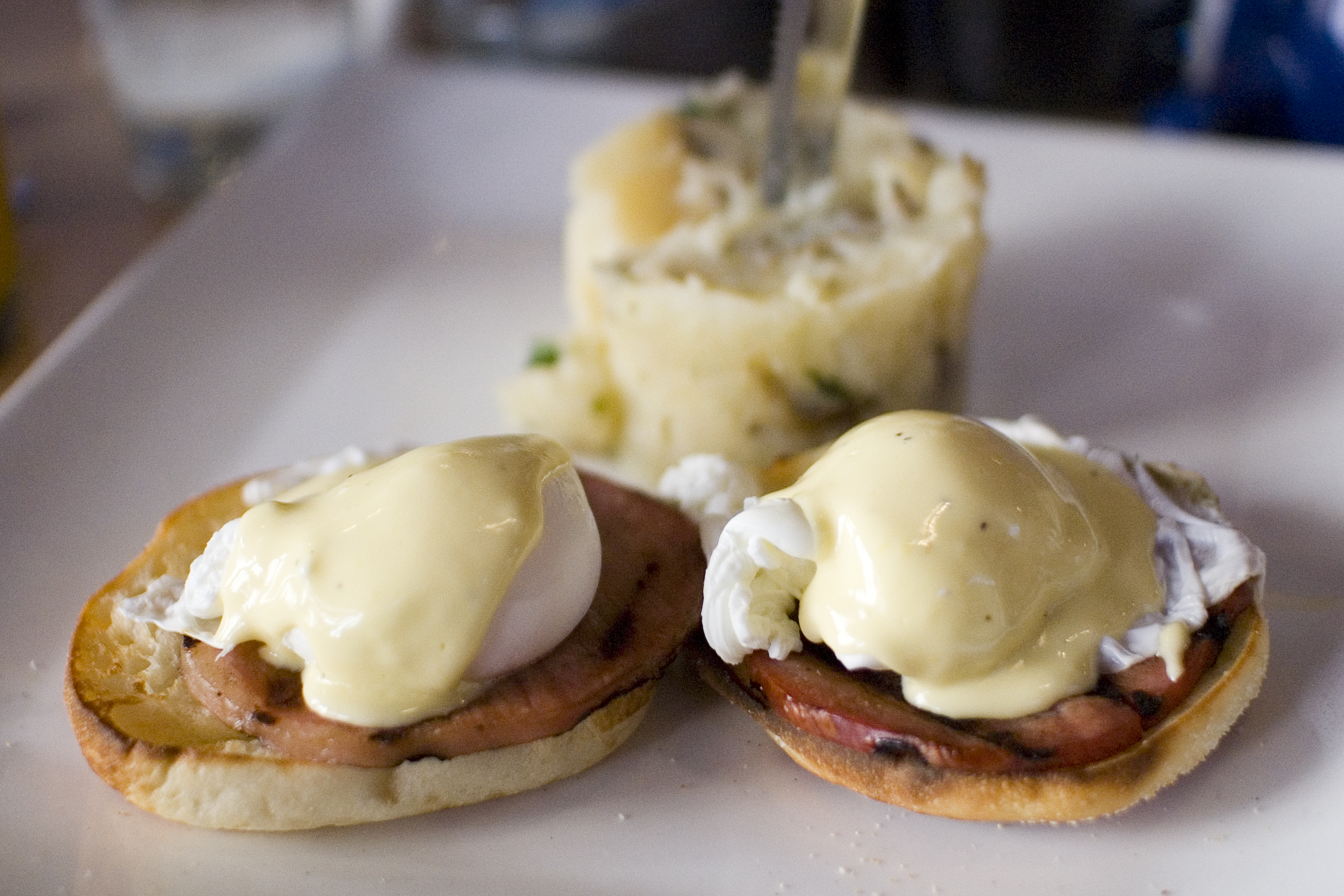
Eggs Benedict, a dish often served for breakfast or brunch

Poached eggs are the basis for many dishes in Louisiana Creole cuisine, such as eggs Sardou, eggs Portuguese, eggs Hussarde and eggs St. Charles. Creole poached egg dishes are typically served for brunches.

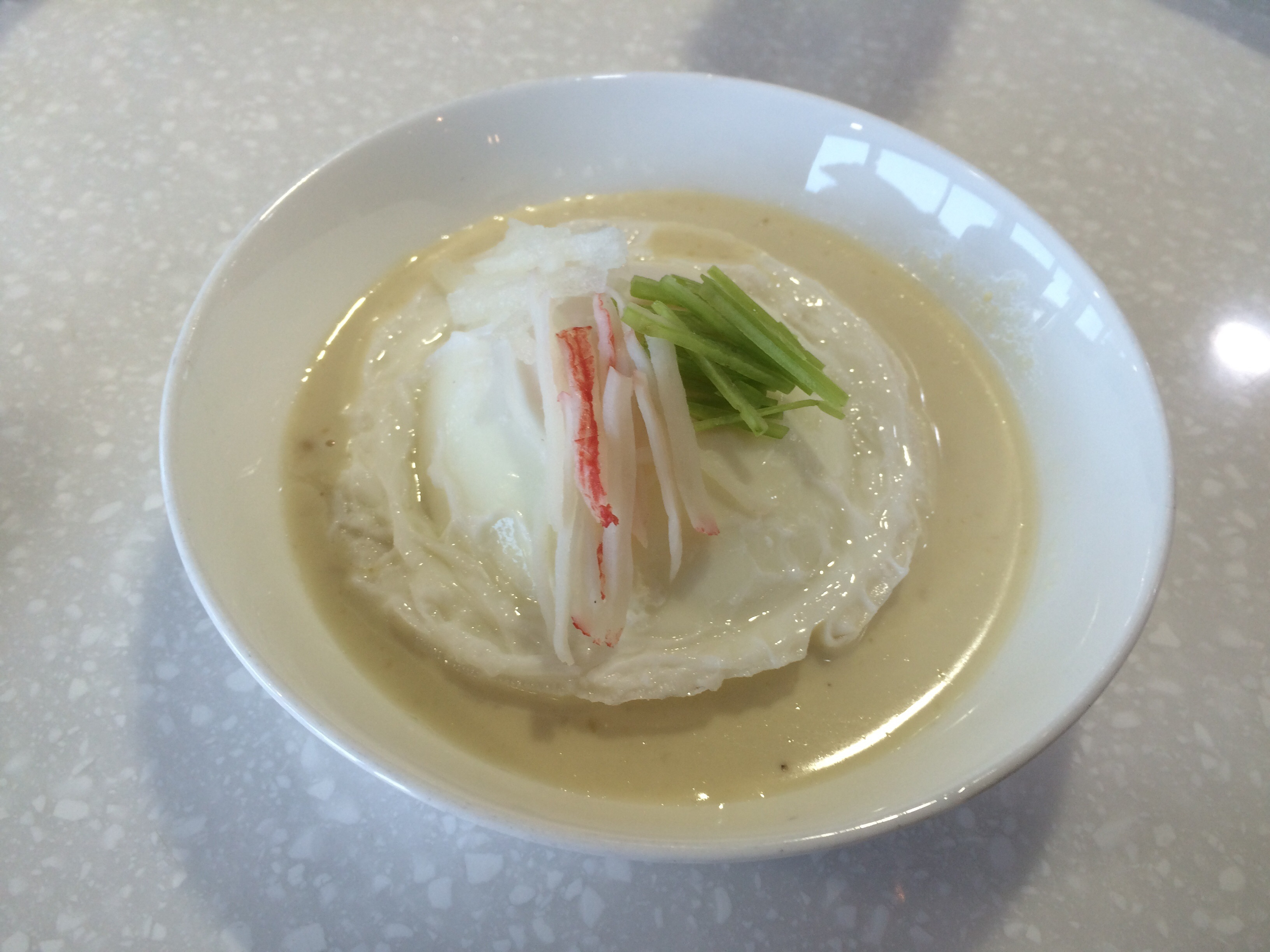
A garnished poached egg in broth

Several cuisines include eggs poached in soup or broth and served in the soup. In parts of central Colombia, for instance, a popular breakfast item is eggs poached in a scallion/coriander broth with milk, known as changua or simply caldo de huevo ("egg soup").

The North African dish shakshouka consists of eggs poached in a spicy tomato sauce.

In Italy, poached eggs are typically seasoned with grated parmigiano reggiano and butter or olive oil.

In Portugal, poached eggs are known as ovos escalfados and are typically served with boiled peas and chouriço.

In Korean cuisine, poached eggs are known as suran (수란) and are topped with a variety of garnishes such as chili threads, rock tripe threads, and scallion threads.

The Turkish dish çılbır consists of poached eggs, yogurt sauce with garlic, and butter with red peppers.

In Bulgaria, poached eggs are served on a bed of yogurt and often sirene, topped with butter and paprika. The dish is called Panagyurishte-style eggs (sometimes "eggs Panagyurian" depending on the translation), and is similar to the Turkish çılbır.

In India, fried eggs are most commonly called "poached". They are sometimes also known as bullseyes, a reference to "bullseye" targets, or "half-boil" in Southern India, indicating that they are partly cooked.

== See also ==
- List of breakfast foods
- List of brunch foods
- Scrambled eggs
