= Poaching (cooking) =

Cooking technique

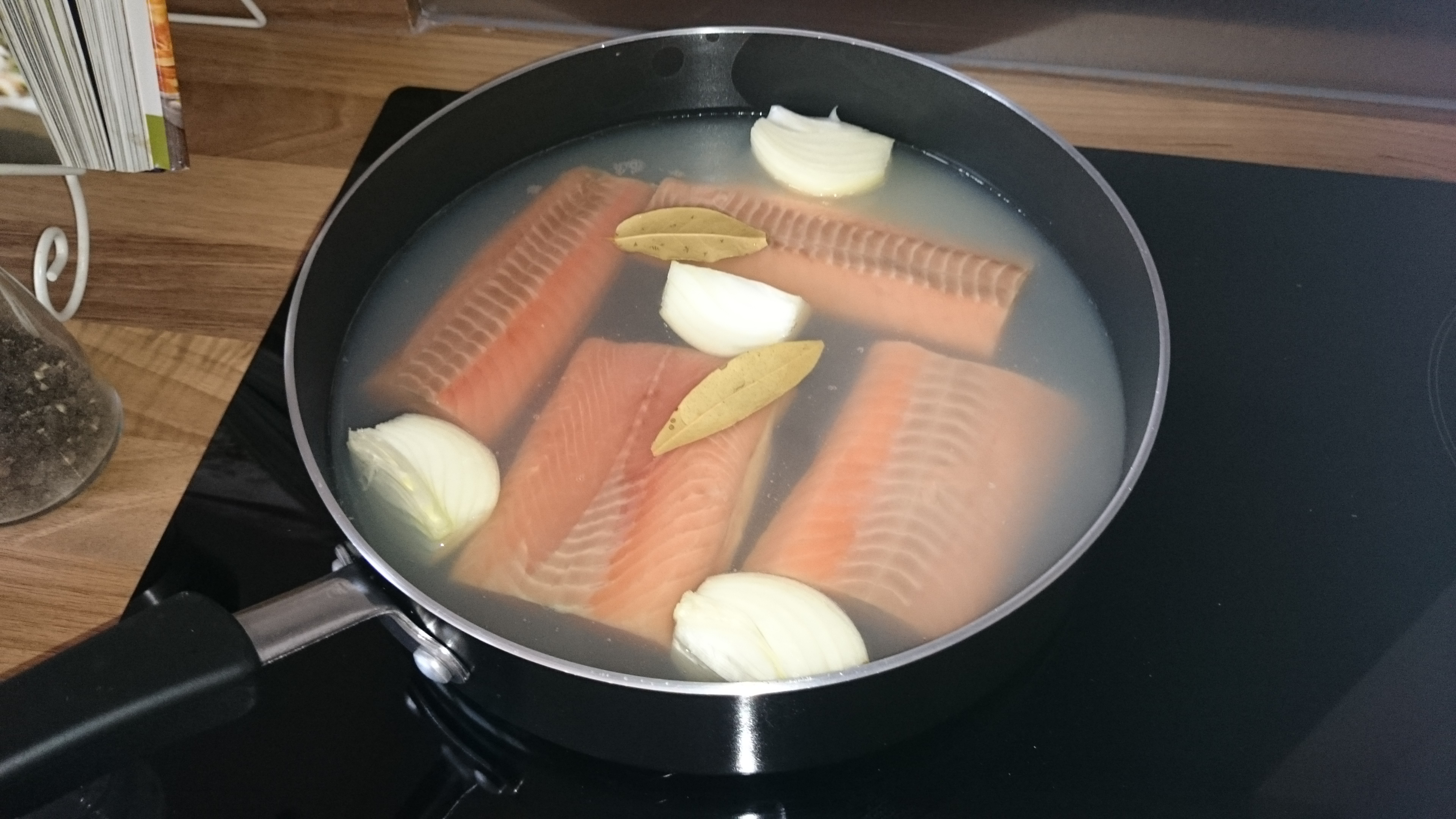
Salmon being poached with onion and bay leaves

Poaching is a cooking technique that involves heating food submerged in a liquid, such as water, milk, stock or wine. Poaching is differentiated from the other "moist heat" cooking methods, such as simmering and boiling, in that it uses a relatively lower temperature (about 70–80 °C or 158–176 °F). This temperature range makes it particularly suitable for delicate food, such as eggs, poultry, fish and fruit, which might easily fall apart or dry out using other cooking methods. Poaching is often considered a healthy cooking method because it does not use fat for cooking or flavoring the food.

== Variations ==
=== Shallow poaching ===
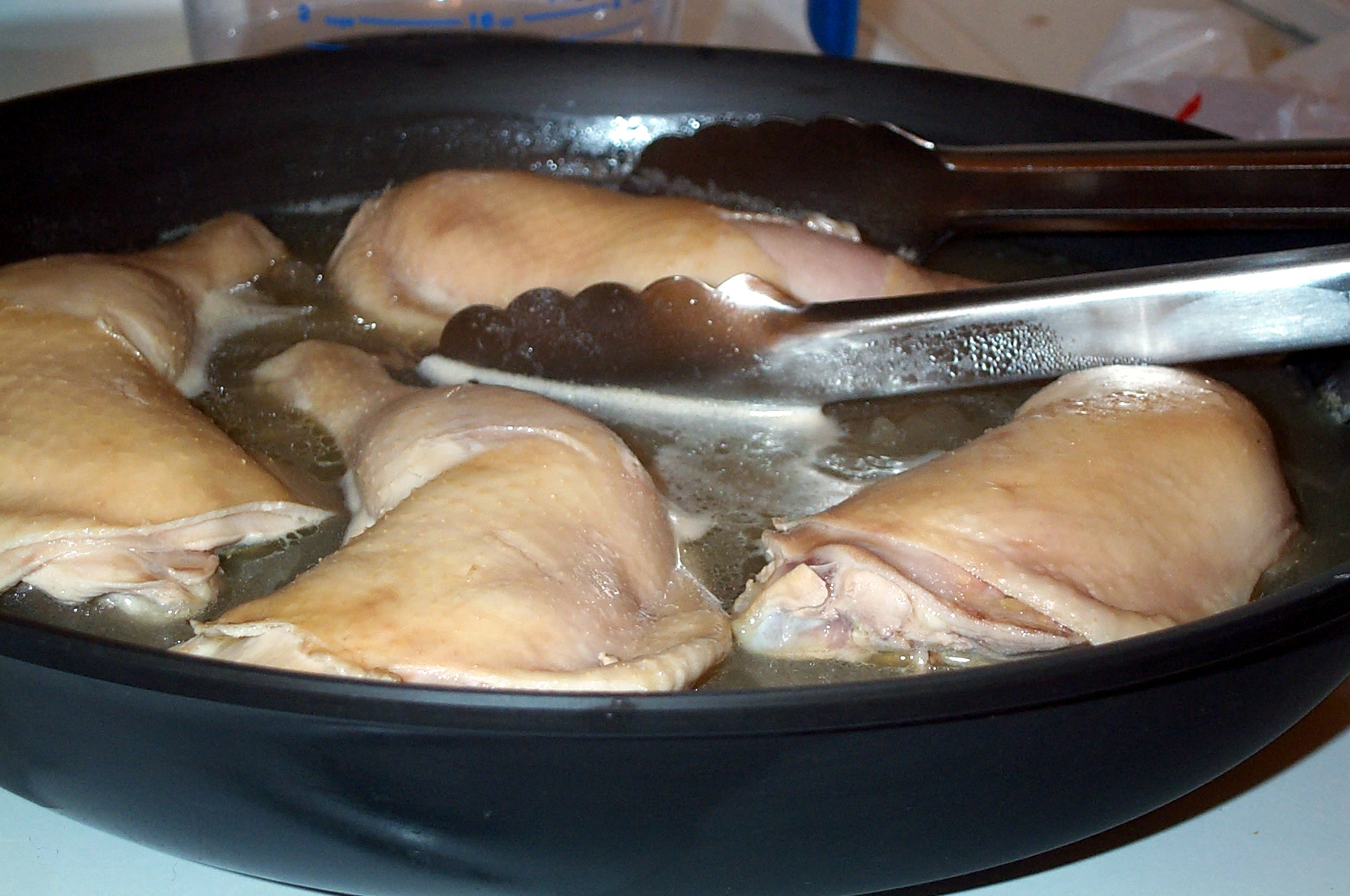
Chicken thighs being shallow poached in a pan

This moist-heat cooking method uses a sautoir or other shallow cooking vessel; heat is transferred by conduction from the pan, to the liquid, to the food. Shallow poaching is best suited for boneless, naturally tender, single-serving-size, sliced, or diced pieces of meat, poultry, or fish.

This preparation involves smearing the inside of the pan with whole butter and adding aromatics to the pan. The items to be cooked are then placed on top of the aromatics presentation side up. Cold poaching liquid is poured in until the product is partially submerged and then heated. The liquid should never be allowed to boil but kept as close to boiling as possible.

=== Deep poaching ===
This technique is similar to shallow poaching, but the food items are fully submerged. The pot used for deep poaching should hold the food, liquid, and aromatics comfortably. There should also be enough space so the surface can be skimmed throughout cooking. It is similar to sous vide cooking, though typically shorter in duration and higher in temperature.

== Poaching liquid ==
The poaching liquid traditionally uses a stock, broth or court-bouillon, which can consist of an acid (wine, lemon juice) and aromatics, such as herbs and spices (for example, bouquet garni and mirepoix), although any flavorful liquid can be used in poaching. The liquid should ideally be around 70–85 °C (158–185 °F), but when poaching chicken, the chicken must reach an internal temperature of at least 74 °C (165 °F) in the core to be eaten safely.

A significant amount of flavor is transferred from the food to the cooking liquid, and so making stock. For maximum flavor, the cooking liquid (stock or cuisson) is usually reduced and used as the base for a soup or sauce.

Poached eggs are generally cooked in water, with or without vinegar, fish in white wine, poultry in stock, and fruit in red wine.

The liquid used for shallow poaching is typically called a cuisson and can be reduced and used as a base for the poached item's sauce.

== Typical preparation ==
Poaching allows the proteins to denature without pulling too much (if any at all) moisture out of the food. For this reason, it is important to keep the heat low and the poaching time to a bare minimum, which will also preserve the flavor of the food.

Typically an egg is poached just to the point where the white is no longer runny, and the yolk is beginning to harden around the edges. Creating a whirlpool before dropping in the egg may help it stay together while poaching by wrapping the white around the yolk.

== Comparison to other methods of preparation ==
Water is a relatively efficient conductor of heat, but it also has a fairly low limit to its maximum potential temperature (100 °C or 212 °F at sea level). As such, it is a technique that applies to a broad spectrum of methods and results. It is used to regulate food at a low temperature for extended periods, as with sous vide. It is also used to rapidly raise the temperature of foods, as with blanching.

Poaching is part of a family of moist-heat cooking methods but separates itself because it is primarily for delicate foods such as eggs. Simmering generally uses a higher temperature for cooking, and because it surrounds the food in water that maintains a more or less constant temperature, simmering cooks food very evenly. Boiling uses the absolute highest temperature for water and is least likely to be used in cooking delicate foods.

While it cannot achieve caramelization, which to many is very desirable, many find the delicate nuance of so-called "blanc" foods very pleasant. Poaching is often confused with stewing, as both techniques involve cooking through simmering. However, the purpose of poaching is to cook while retaining the basic shape and structure of the food rather than to soften it, as with stewing.

== See also ==
- Poached egg
- Sous-vide
