= Ramekin =

Small bowl used for culinary purposes

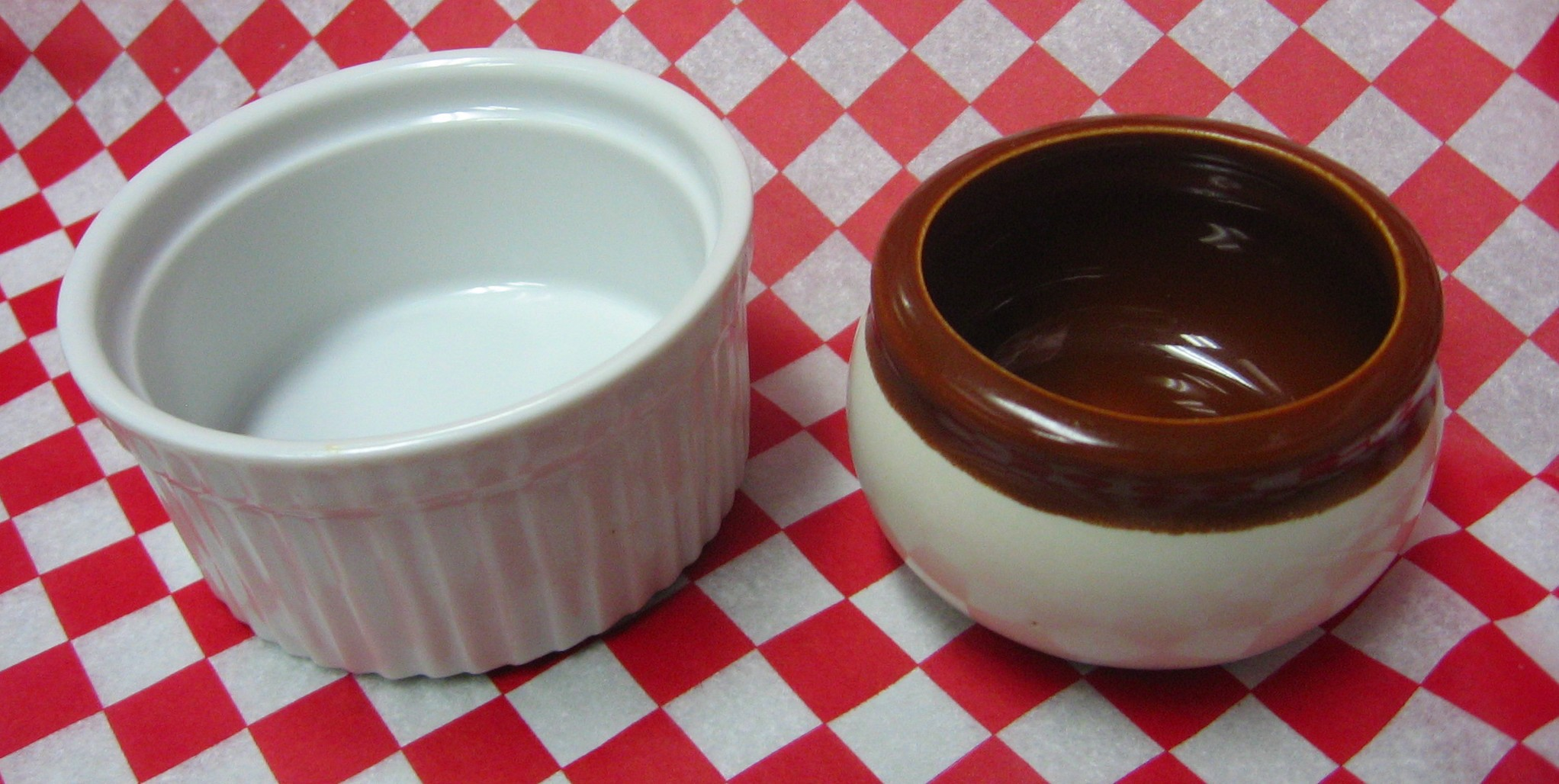
Two styles of ramekin

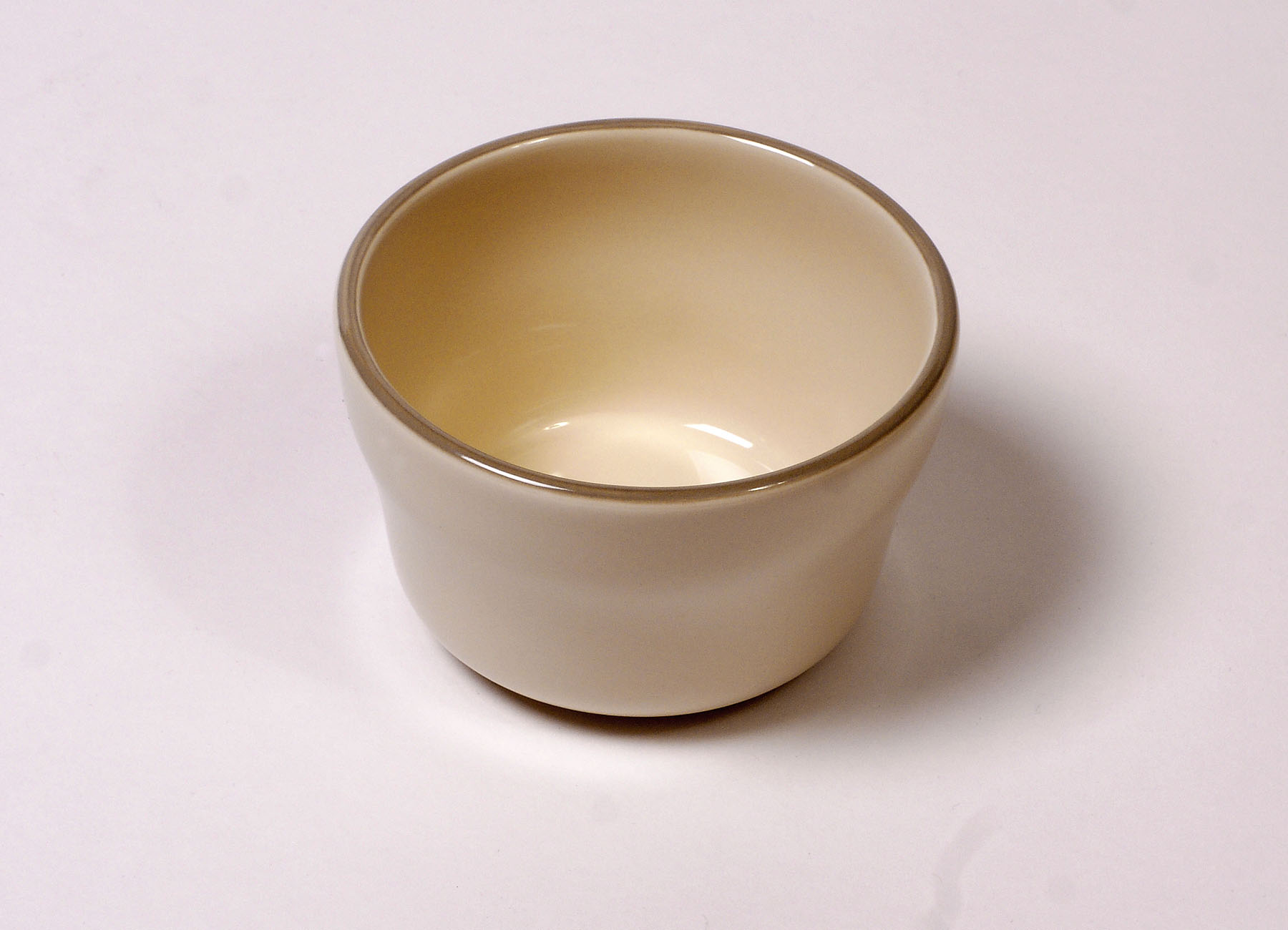
A ramekin with a plain exterior

A ramekin (/ˈræmɪkɪn/, /ˈræmkɪn/; also spelled ramequin) is a small dish used for culinary purposes.

== Name ==
The term is derived from the French ramequin, a cheese- or meat-based dish baked in a small mould. The French term is in turn derived from early modern Dutch rammeken, which translated to 'toast' or 'roasted minced meat', itself apparently from ram 'battering ram' + -kin 'diminutive', but it is unclear why.

== Usage ==
With a common capacity range of approximately 50–250 mL (1 1/2–8 1/2 US fl oz), ramekins are versatile dishes often used to bake and serve individual portions of both savory and sweet recipes. They are ideal for preparing classic dishes like crème brûlée, soufflé, molten chocolate cake, and other custard or egg-based recipes. Ramekins are also used for serving sides, condiments, or garnishes alongside entrées and can hold small portions of foods such as French onion soup, moin moin, and crumbles. Their size and heat-resistant design make them suitable for a wide range of culinary uses, from desserts to baked side dishes.

Traditionally a circular bowl with sides perpendicular to the bottom and with exterior fluting, ramekins can also be found in novelty shapes like flowers, hearts, and stars.

Ramekins are usually designed to resist high temperatures, as they are frequently used in ovens or, in the case of crème brûlée, exposed to the flame of a cooking torch.

In the Victorian era, a specialized utensil, a ramekin fork, was used to consume ham or seafood mixed with a rich sauce in a ramekin.

== Sources ==
- Hood, W. Edmund; Hood, William P.; Berlin, Roslyn; Wawrynek, Edward (1999). Tiffany Silver Flatware 1845-1905: When Dining was an Art. Antique Collectors' Club. ISBN 978-1-85149-325-8.
