= Wodzianka =

Silesian and Central Poland bread soup

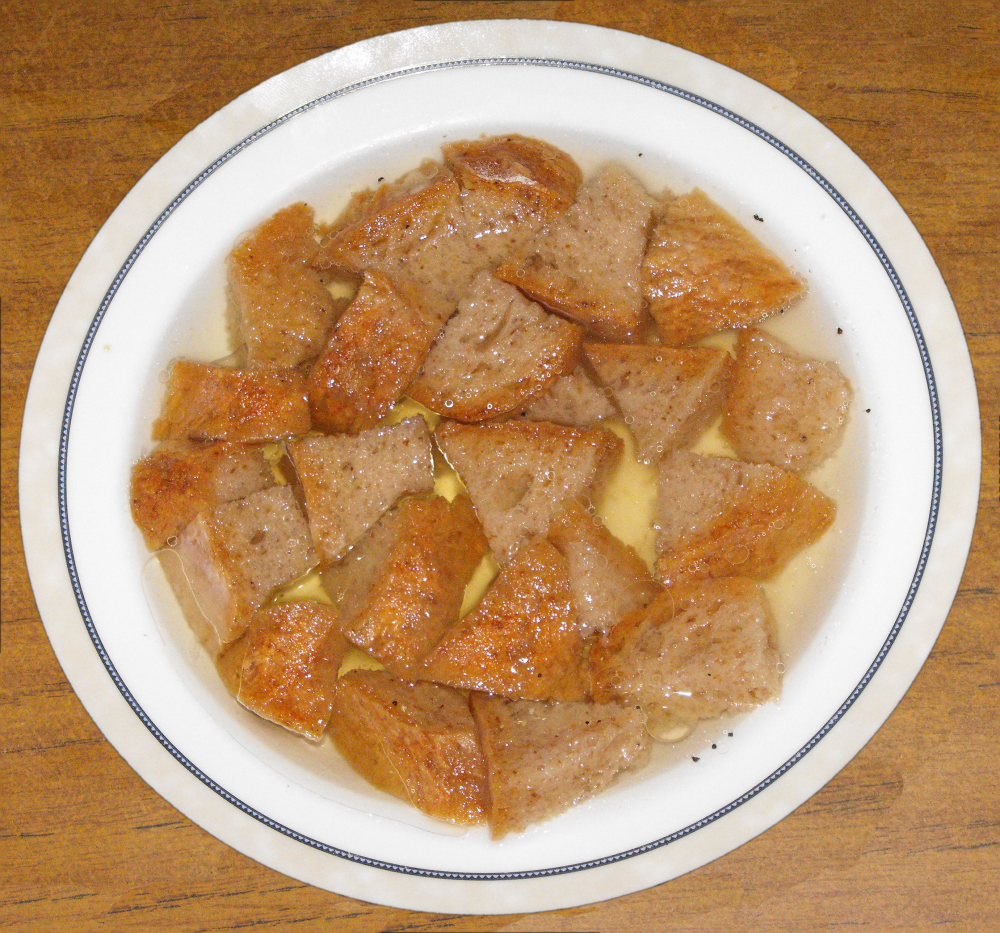
- Alternative names: wodzionka, kapłon, kapłonek
- Type: bread soup
- Main ingredients: stale bread, fat (lard or butter), water

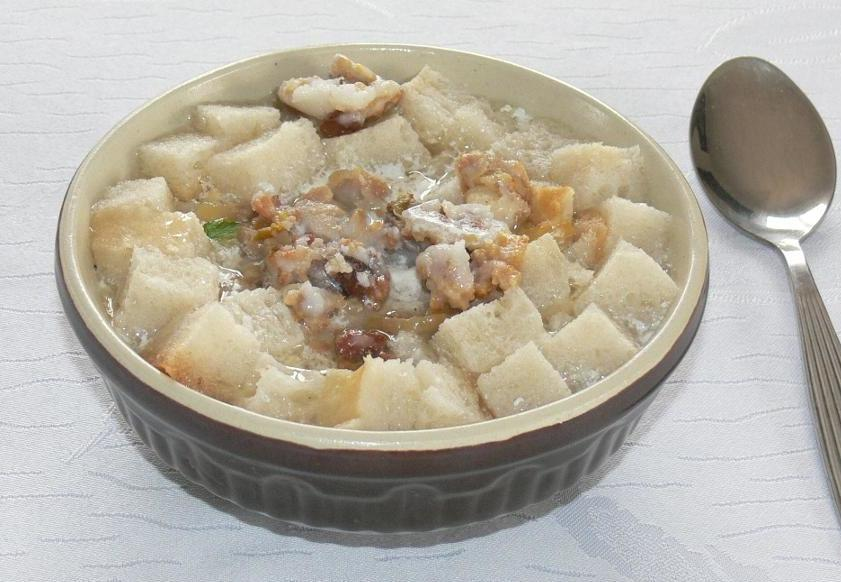
„Kapłonek (wodzianka) from Gałków”

Wodzianka (Silesian: wodzionka / wodźůnka / wodziōnka), kapłon, kapłonek – in Polish cuisine, a Silesian and Central Poland (Note: Central Poland (Polska Środkowa) – to some extent synonymous with the Łódź Voivodeship) bread soup made from stale bread, fat and water (the name wodzianka comes from the word woda which means water), sometimes with vegetables. Traditionally, wodzianka is prepared by soaking two- to three-day-old stale bread in water or broth and adding garlic, bay leaves, black pepper and other seasonings, fried bacon, and lard or butter. It was reportedly served in late autumn and winter, when cows had less milk.

== See also ==
- Açorda – Portuguese bread soup
- Acquacotta – Italian soup with stale bread as a primary ingredient
- Crouton – Rebaked bread used as topping
- Hoppel poppel – Leftover potato and egg casserole
- Ribollita – Italian bread soup
- Tyurya – Russian cold bread soup
