= Majorcan soup =

Culinary dish

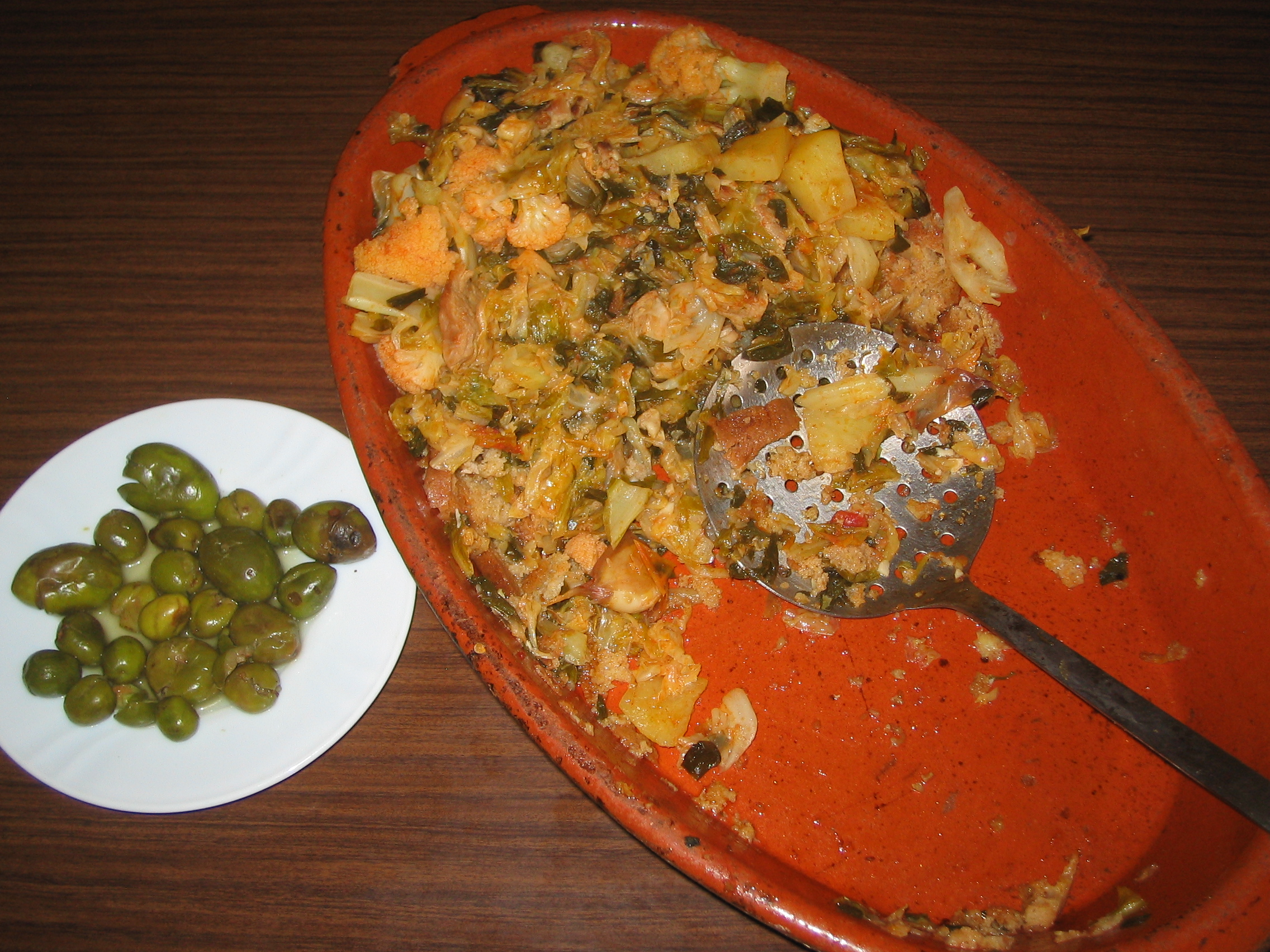
Majorcan dry soup, traditionally served with olives

Mallorcan soup (also spelled Majorcan; Catalan: sopes mallorquines; Spanish: sopas mallorquinas) or Mallorcan dry soup is a typical dish in the gastronomy of the island of Mallorca. It is a rustic dish, often closer in texture to a casserole or very thick stew. It typically is eaten with a fork rather than a spoon.

This dish appears in the Middle Ages. Its origin is peasant, probably from the villages of the Majorcan mountains (Serra de Tramuntana). Reflecting the harshness of rural life, it traditionally was made with whatever produce was available in the vegetable garden, primarily cabbage, spring onions, leeks and garlic, to which stale bread and vegetable stock were added. In rare cases, meat or wild mushrooms might be included. According to one source, it was prepared without pork by the Chuetas, those descendants of Jews forcibly converted during the Inquisition, who had lived on the island for centuries, and then spread among the rest of the Majorcan population.

The dish is eaten mainly in winter and is quite commonly found in village restaurants offering the island cuisine.

Mallorcan sope is prepared and presented in a traditional terracotta dish, locally referred to as a greixonera. It is a thick soup, in appearance similar to a vegetable stew.

== Ingredients and preparation ==
The base of the Majorcan soup is the bread: thin, stale slices of a Majorcan brown bread made with buckwheat flour, pa moreno. Bags of the thinly sliced stale bread are often sold by bakers for convenient sopes making.

Vegetables can include cabbage, cauliflower, tomatoes, onions, garlic, parsley. Other seasonal vegetables may be included. Meats may include pork or a local sausage, such as the spicy boutifarre or the camaiot. Spices include sweet paprika.

Typically ingredients are layered in a greixonera and are baked and served in the same vessel.

== Influence ==
Llorenç Villalonga i Pons described the dish in 1960 in his book Majorca:

Is there a typical Majorcan cuisine and pastry? Great cuisine, like haute couture, is universal in its French-style embellishments, but popular dishes have their own character. The first of these is Majorcan soup. It is a fun and primitive dish, in the preparation of which intuition plays an important role. There are no fixed recipes. The broth is prepared only with vegetables that vary according to the season. As a result, some species do not go well with others. Which ones? It is said in Mallorca that the best cooks do not know. The women of the countryside, on the other hand, do. In short, Majorcan soups are either delicious or not, depending on the hand that prepares them. It is not a dish to ask for in a good restaurant, but rather in an old mountain inn or in a bistro on the coast.

== Similar dishes ==
Many Mediterranean cuisines include soups that feature day-old bread. There are also bread soups in other cuisines, such as Ollebrod in Danish cuisine, Tyurya in Russian cuisine, Wodzianka in Polish cuisine (Silesia and Central Poland), and Paomo in Chinese cuisine.
