= Peasant foods =

Dishes eaten by peasants

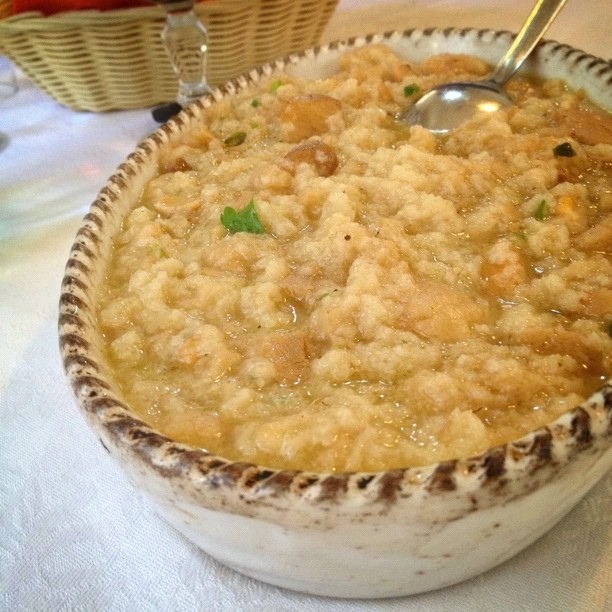
Acquacotta, an Italian bread soup

Peasant foods are dishes made from accessible and inexpensive ingredients, as would have been eaten by peasants.

Studies on historical rural diets in Sweden indicates that peasant foods were predominantly grain-based. Periodic shortages in domestic grain production led to Sweden's reliance on imported grains while the Swedish peasants relied on locally available resources to survive.

In many historical periods, peasant foods have been stigmatized.

== Common types ==
=== Meat-and-grain sausages or mushes ===
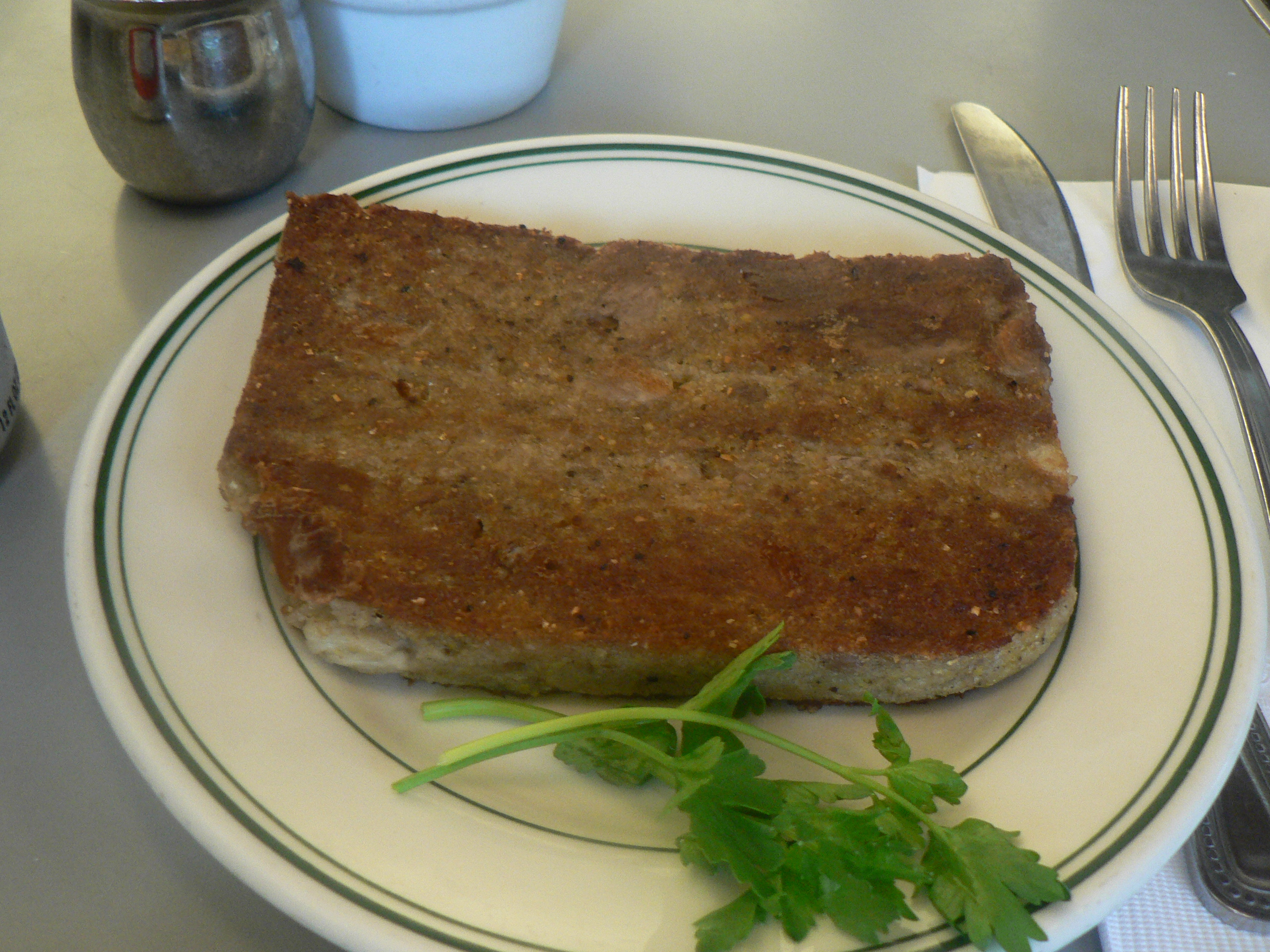
Scrapple, a Pennsylvania Dutch poverty food

Ground meat or meat scraps mixed with grain in approximately equal proportions, then often formed into a loaf, sliced, and fried

- Balkenbrij
- Black pudding
- Boudin
- Daing, a style of sun-dried fish in the Philippines
- Goetta, a pork or pork-and-beef and pinhead oats sausage
- Groaty pudding
- Haggis, a savory dish containing sheep's pluck (heart, liver, and lungs), minced with onion, oatmeal, suet, spices, and salt, mixed with stock, and cooked while encased in a sheep's stomach
- Knipp
- Livermush
- Lorne sausage
- Meatloaf
- Scrapple, a spiced mush of pig scraps, cornmeal and other flours fried up solid
- Slatur

=== Pasta ===
- Pasta con i peperoni cruschi, an Italian pasta dish from Basilicata, defined a true representative of cucina povera (Italian for 'cuisine of the poor')
- Pasta e fagioli, a traditional Italian pasta soup
- Pasta mollicata, Italian pasta dish from southern Italy, especially Basilicata, often known as a "poor man's dish"
- Testaroli

=== Sauces ===
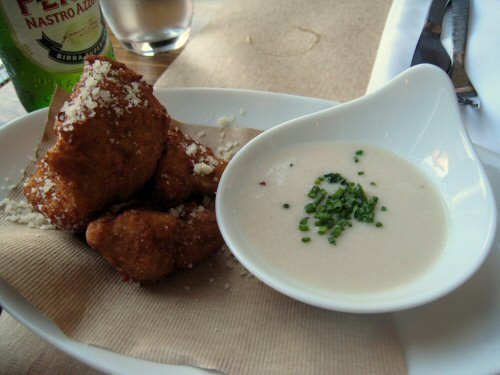
Fried cauliflower with agliata sauce

- Agliata – a garlic sauce in Italian cuisine that has been a peasant food, and also used by upper-class people

=== Soups and stews ===
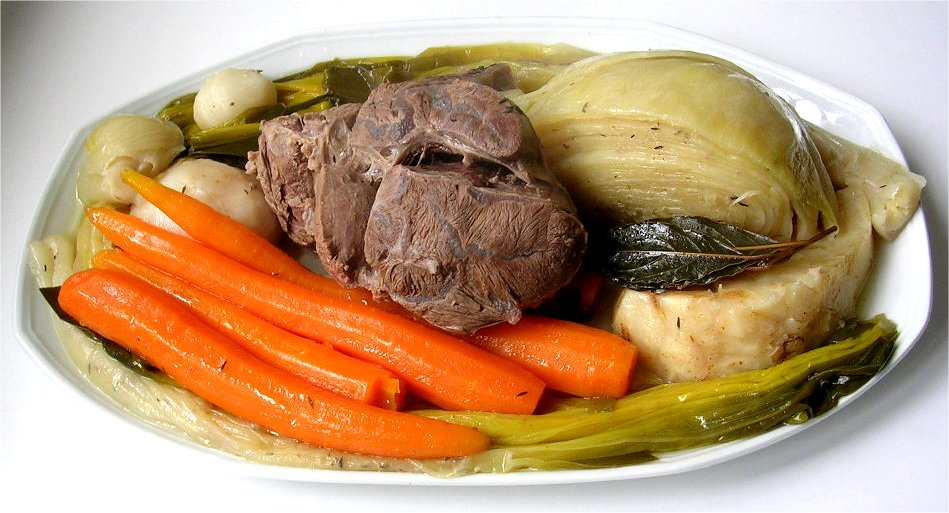
Pot-au-feu, the basic French stew, a dish popular with both the poor and the rich alike

- Acquacotta, an Italian soup that dates to ancient history. Primary ingredients are water, stale bread, onion, tomato and olive oil, along with various vegetables and leftover foods that may have been available.
- Batchoy (Tagalog), a Filipino meat soup or noodle soup made with pork and pork offal in ginger-flavored broth, traditionally with pork blood added
- Cassoulet, a French bean, meat, and vegetable stew originating from the rural Southwest that has since become a staple of French cuisine
- Cawl, a Welsh broth or soup
- Cholent, a traditional Jewish Sabbath stew
- Congee, a rice-based gruel associated with rice-growing societies
- Chupe, refers to a variety of stews from South America generally made with chicken, red meat, lamb or beef tripe and other offal
- Duckefett, a German sauce
- Dinuguan, a Filipino pork blood stew infused with vinegar
- Feijoada, originally a Portuguese stew consisting of beans and meat; also a Brazilian dish originally made by slaves from leftover ingredients from their master's house
- Gazpacho, typically a tomato-based vegetable soup, traditionally served cold, originating in the southern Spanish region of Andalusia
- Minestrone, the meal in one pot of ancient Italy that is still a basic part of Italian cuisine
- Mulligan stew, a stew often made by itinerant workers
- Mujaddara, an Arabian dish of lentils, rice, grains, and onions
- Pappa al pomodoro, a bread soup typically prepared with tomatoes, bread, olive oil, garlic, and basil
- Pea soup or "pease pudding", a common thick soup, from when dried peas were a very common food in Europe, still widely eaten there and in French Canada
- Pot-au-feu, the French stew of oxtail, marrow, and vegetables, sometimes sausage
- Pottage, a staple stew made from boiling vegetables, grains and whatever was available, since Neolithic times in the British Isles
- Ratatouille, a French stewed vegetable dish
- Shchi, a traditional Russian soup made from cabbage, meat, mushrooms, flour and sour cream, usually eaten with rye bread
- Scouse (food), a stew-type dish from Liverpool, which gives its name to the residents of the city, who are known as scousers
- Zatiruha, an Eastern European soup

=== List of peasant foods ===
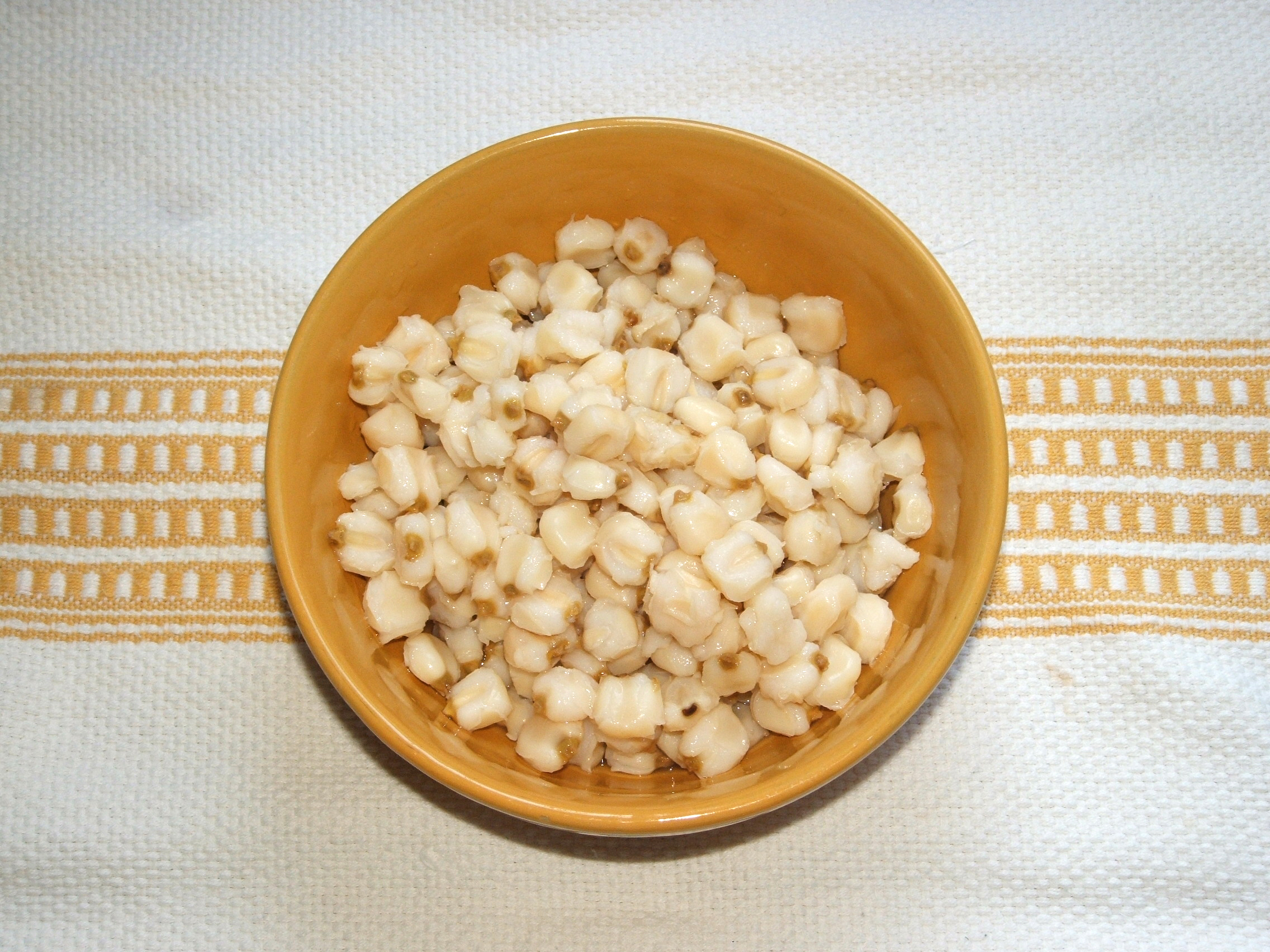
Bowl of hominy, a form of treated corn

- Baked beans, the simple stewed bean dish
- Barbacoa, a form of slow cooking, often of an animal head, a predecessor to barbecue
- Bulgur wheat, with vegetables or meat
- Broken rice, which is often cheaper than whole grains and cooks more quickly
- Bubble and squeak, a simple British dish, cooked and fried with potatoes and cabbage mixed together
- Finger millet balls made from ragi flour which is boiled with water and balls are formed and eaten with vegetable gravy
- Greens, such as dandelion and collard
- Head cheese, made from boiling down the cleaned-out head of an animal to make broth, still made
- Hominy, a form of corn specially prepared to be more nutritious
- Horsebread, a low-cost European bread that was a recourse of the poor
- Katemeshi, a Japanese peasant food consisting of rice, barley, millet and chopped daikon radish
- Lampredotto, Florentine dish or sandwich made from a cow's fourth stomach
- Panzanella, Italian salad of soaked stale bread, onions and tomatoes
- Pierogi, a Polish dumpling filled with potato, cheese, mushroom, sauerkraut, meat, or berries.
- Polenta, a porridge made with the corn left to Italian farmers so that land holders could sell all the wheat crops, still a popular food
- Pumpernickel, a traditional dark rye bread of Germany, made with a long, slow (16–24 hours) steam-baking process, and a sour culture
- Ratatouille, the stewed vegetable dish
- Red beans and rice, the Louisiana Creole dish made with red beans, vegetables, spices, and leftover pork bones slowly cooked together, and served over rice, common on Mondays when working women were hand-washing clothes
- Salami, a long-lasting sausage, used to supplement a meat-deficient diet
- Soul food, developed by enslaved African-Americans, primarily using ingredients undesired and given away by their enslavers
- Succotash, a blend of corn and beans
- Tacos, cooked meats or vegetables wrapped in native maize tortillas in the Americas
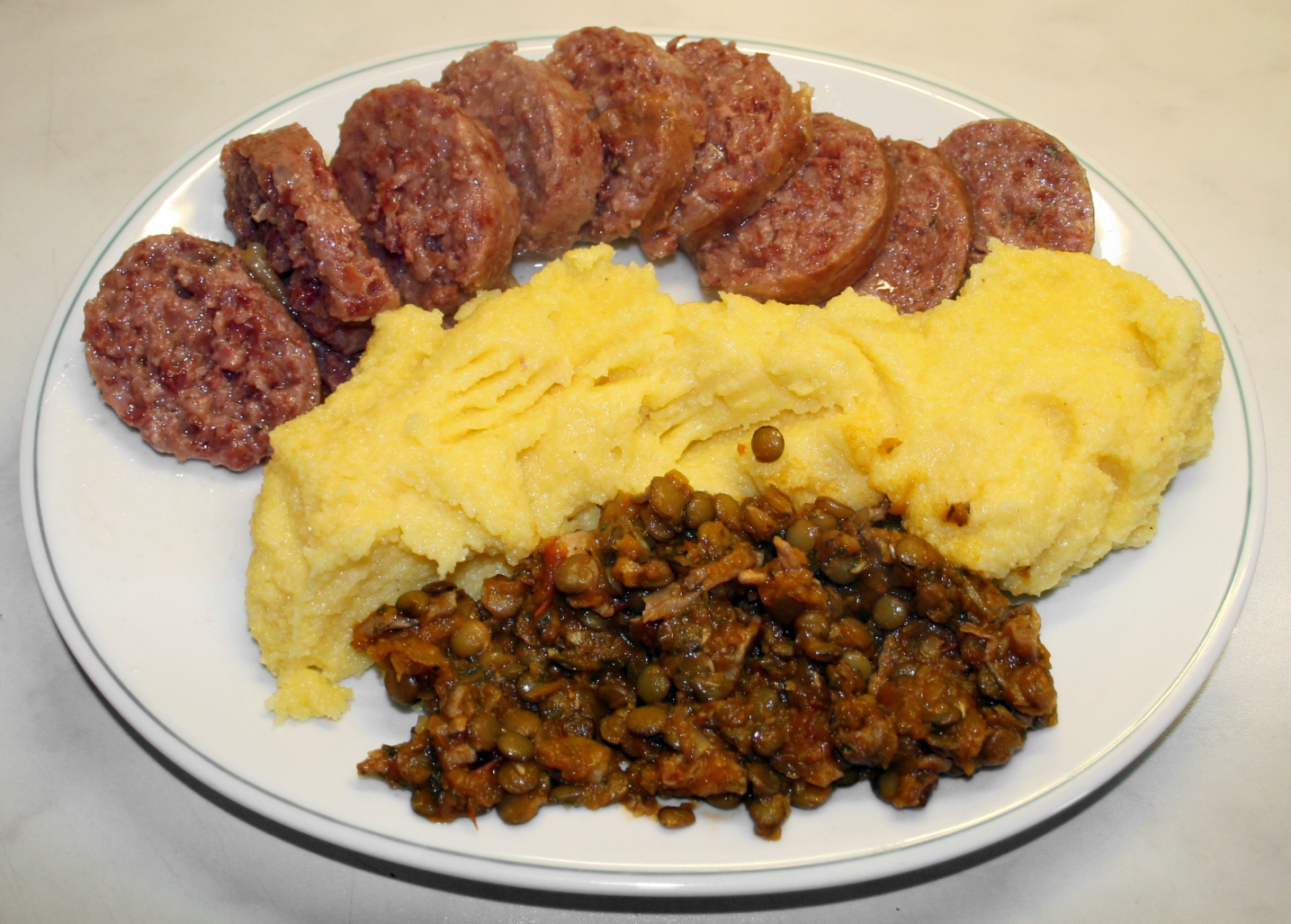
Polenta with lentils and cotechino, a sausage made of pig skin, filled with rind, pork meat and spices, from Italy

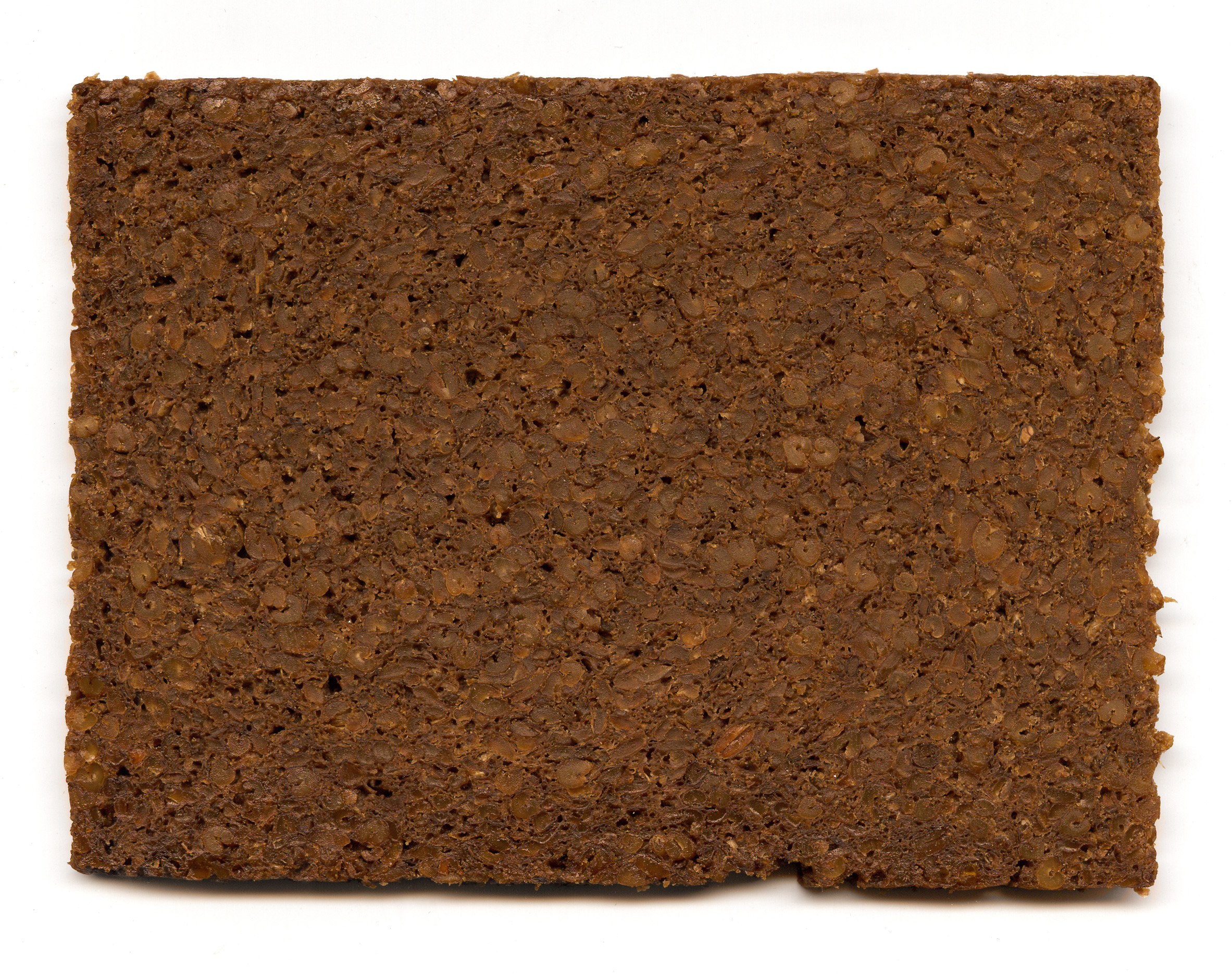
A slice of pumpernickel bread

== See also ==
- Famine food – foods turned to in times of crisis, sometimes across whole societies
- Farm-to-table
- Slow Food – a social movement inspired by home cooking and regional tradition as an alternative to fast food
- Social class differences in food consumption
- Traditional knowledge
