= Zuppa toscana =

Italian soup

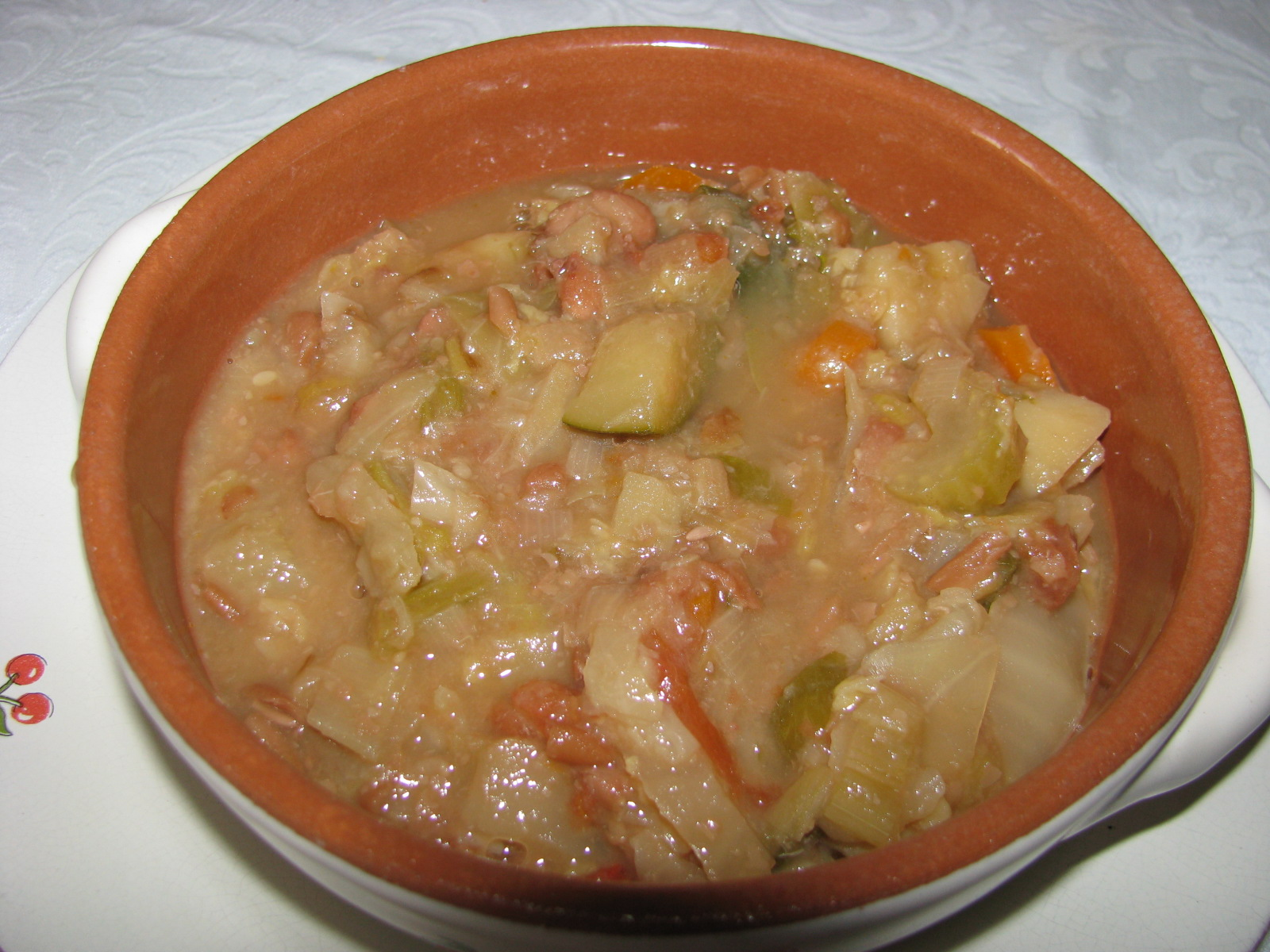
- Type: Soup
- Course: Primo (Italian course), one-dish meal
- Place of origin: Italy
- Region or state: Tuscany
- Main ingredients: Cannellini beans, potatoes, kale
- Variations: Olive Garden version: Italian sausage, red pepper, onion, bacon, garlic, chicken broth, cream

Zuppa toscana (lit. 'Tuscan soup'), also known in Italy as minestra di pane (lit. 'bread soup'), is a soup from the region of Tuscany, northern Italy. While there are many variations, its most common ingredients are cannellini beans, potatoes, and kale.

== History ==
According to the older generation, minestra di pane (zuppa toscana's ancestor) was originally created as a way to use up leftover stale bread. For the poor, it was a waste to throw this bread away; instead they made a watery soup out of it. Minestra di pane has been part of Italian culture for a long time—so long, in fact, that there are legends about Leonardo da Vinci eating it himself. This soup has become part of Tuscan identity.

== Similarly-named dishes ==
The American restaurant chain Olive Garden offers a very different soup under the name zuppa toscana. Rather than being based on beans, it is made with Italian sausage, red pepper, onion, bacon, garlic, chicken broth, cream, potatoes, and kale.

== See also ==
- Bread soup
- Ribollita
