= Pão Alentejano =

Portuguese bread

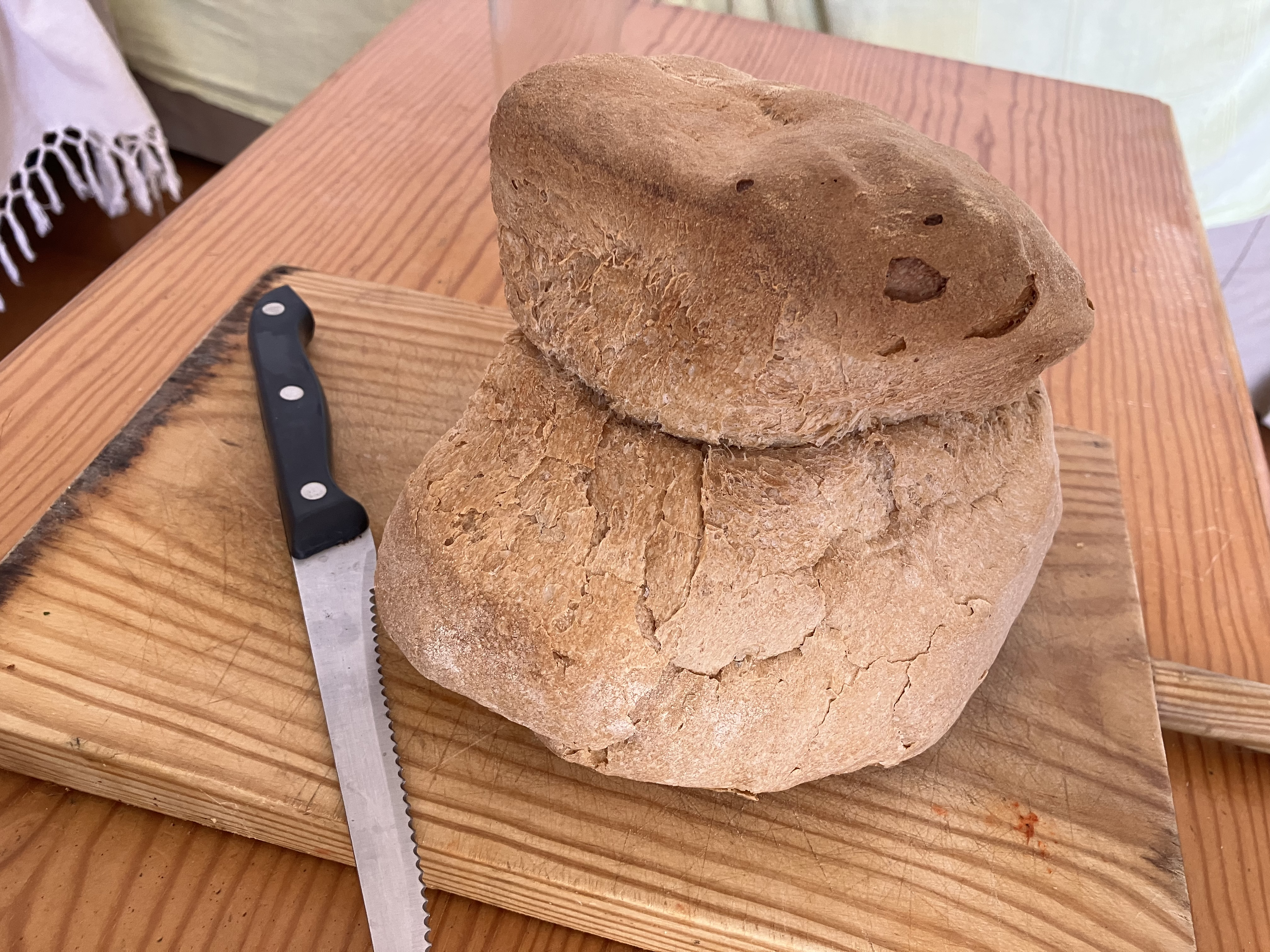
- Pao Alentejano with its characteristic hump
- Alternative names: Alentejo bread
- Type: Bread
- Place of origin: Alentejo Region
- Associated cuisine: Portuguese
- Main ingredients: Wheat

Pão Alentejano or Alentejo bread is a traditional wheat bread of Portugal's Alentejo region.

== History ==
The bread was traditionally produced in homes, with local women taking their dough for baking in communal ovens, or by small bakeries.

Alentejo is a historical major producer of wheat for Portugal (and previously for Rome, which introduced the crop to the area), and during the period of Arab colonization the bread became well-known throughout the country. In the 20th century industrial producers started to sell the bread under the name; these often do not use traditional recipes or techniques and contain additional ingredients such as preservatives.

According to Visao, the bread is "the basis of food in Alentejo". According to Hola, "all Portuguese recognize it as one of the best [breads] in the country".

== Ingredients and preparation ==
Traditionally the bread contains only wheat flour, yeast or leftover bread dough (which acts as a type of sourdough starter), salt, and water and is baked in a wood-fired oven.

Pão Alentejano is traditionally the bread used for Açorda Alentejana, a type of bread soup.

== Description ==
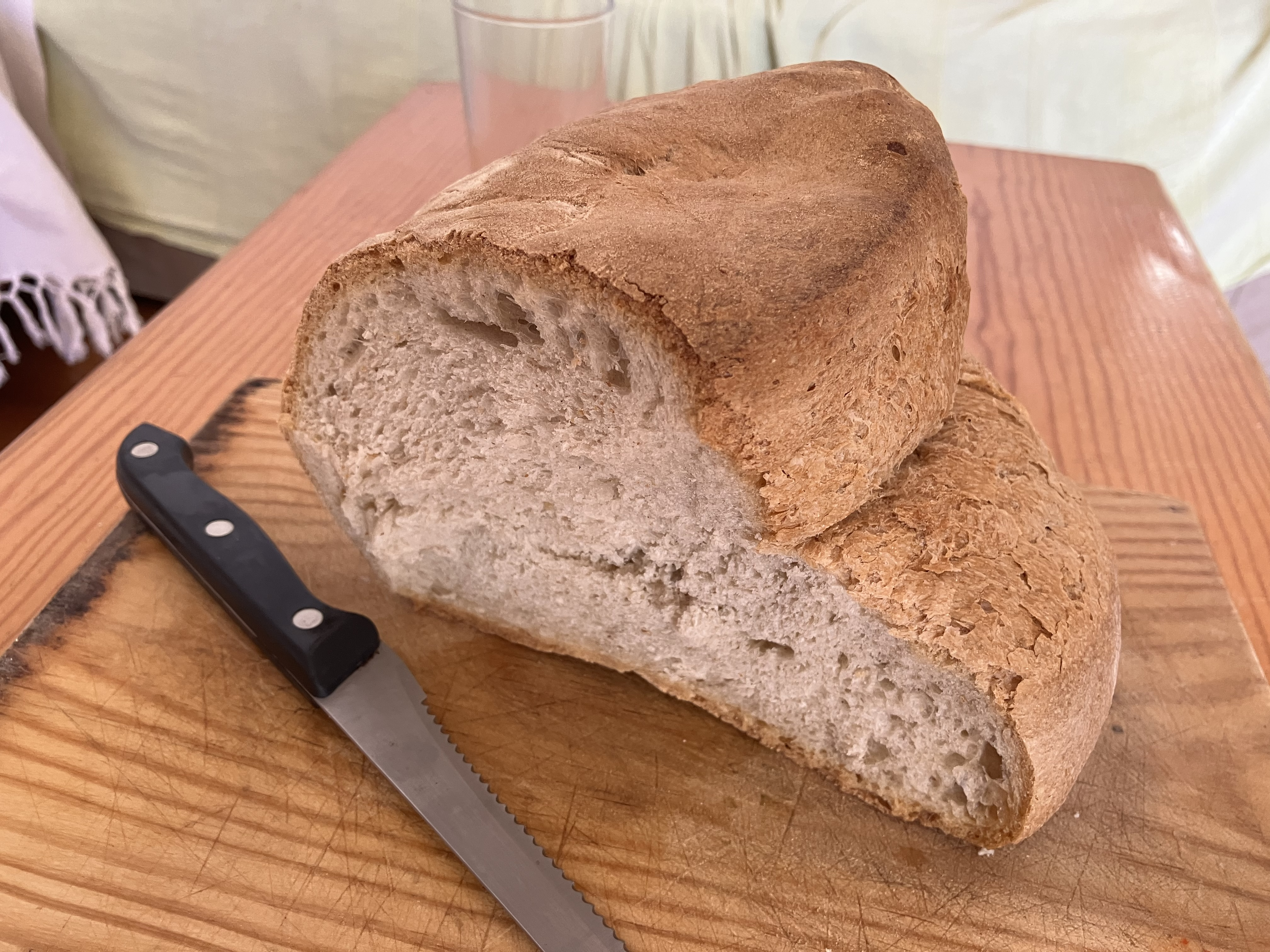
Pao Alentejano

The bread is a pão de testa (bread with a forehead), a bread traditionally shaped by folding one end of the dough over the center so that when ready for the oven one side is higher than the other, and the bread develops a characteristic hump. A typical loaf weighs 1 kilogram (2.2 lb) to 1.5 kilograms (3.3 lb).

== See also ==
- List of breads
