= Popara =

Sweet dish made with old bread

Popara Попара
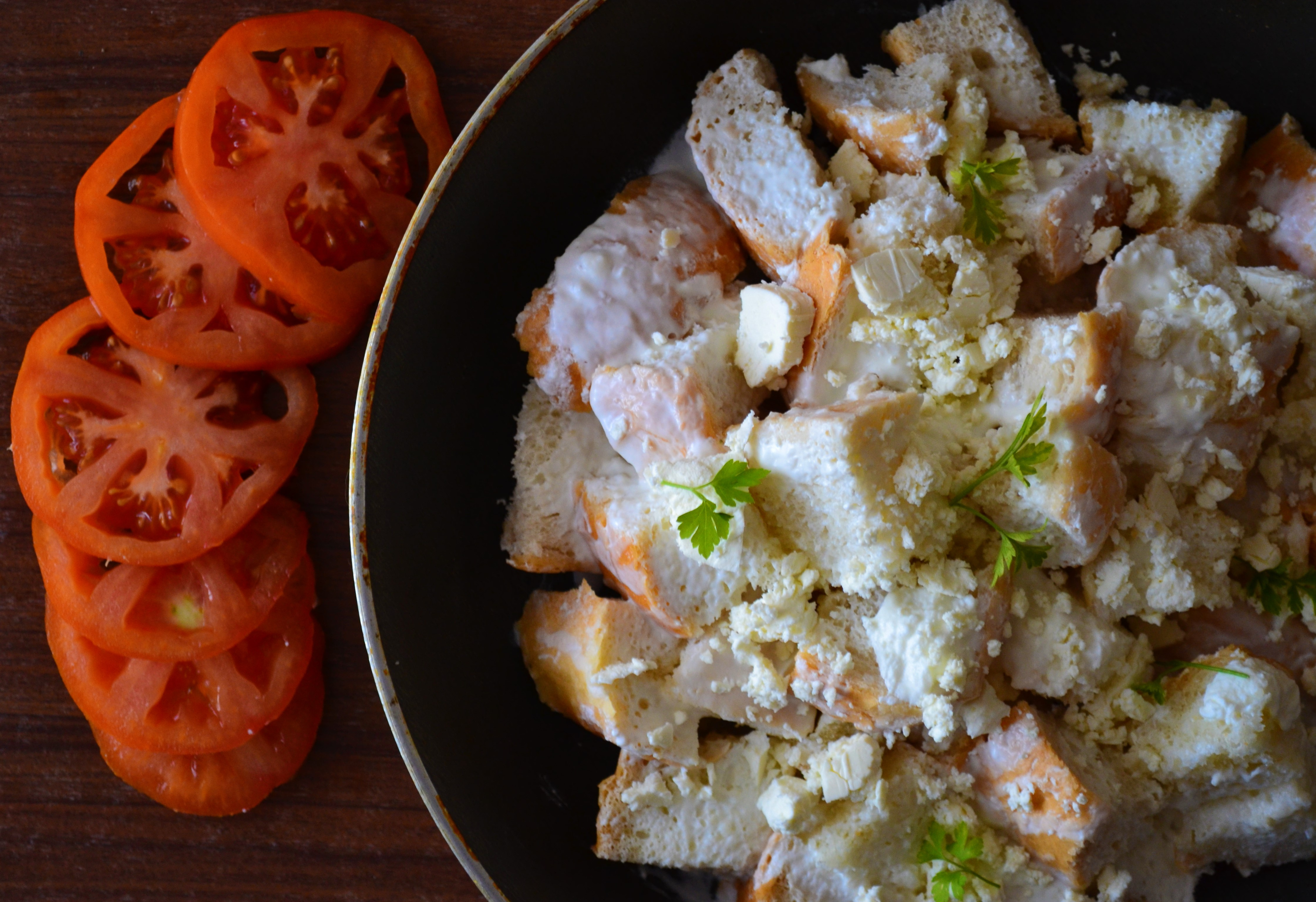
- Alternative names: Pоpara
- Course: Main dish
- Region or state: Balkans
- Main ingredients: Bread, sugar or honey, water, milk or tea, kaymak, cheese

Popara (Cyrillic: попара, Greek: παπάρα, papara, Turkish: papara) is a dish made with bread. Typically the bread should be old, stale and have a thick crust. It is soaked in either hot tea, milk or water. Sugar, honey, butter, and cheese are often added. It is mostly made in Bulgaria, Greece, Serbia, Bosnia and Herzegovina, North Macedonia, Turkey, Croatia and Montenegro.

== See also ==
- Bread soup
- Goody (food)
- Tirit
- Tyurya
