= Flummadiddle =

Bread pudding from New England

- Type: Pudding
- Place of origin: United States
- Main ingredients: Stale bread, pork fat, molasses, spices (cinnamon, allspice, cloves and others)

Flummadiddle is a baked main course pudding consisting of stale bread, pork fat, molasses, and spices including cinnamon, allspice, and cloves. It was a part of early American cuisine, especially of New England fishermen.

== See also ==
- List of bread dishes
