= Acquacotta =

Italian soup with stale bread as a primary ingredient

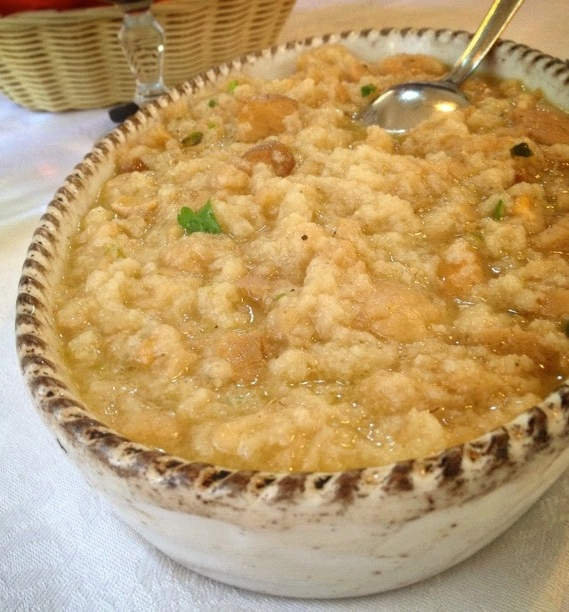
- Acquacotta soup
- Type: Soup
- Course: Primo (Italian course)
- Place of origin: Italy
- Region or state: Maremma
- Invented: Ancient history
- Main ingredients: Water, stale bread, onion, olive oil
- Ingredients generally used: Vegetables, leftover foods
- Variations: Acquacotta con funghi, acquacotta con peperoni

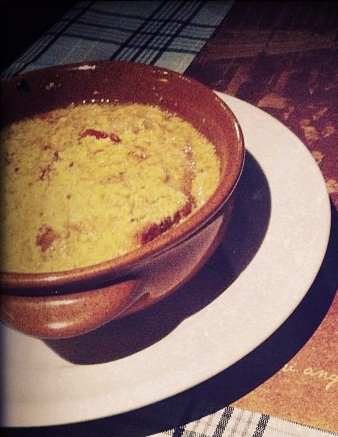
Acquacotta at a restaurant in Milan, Italy

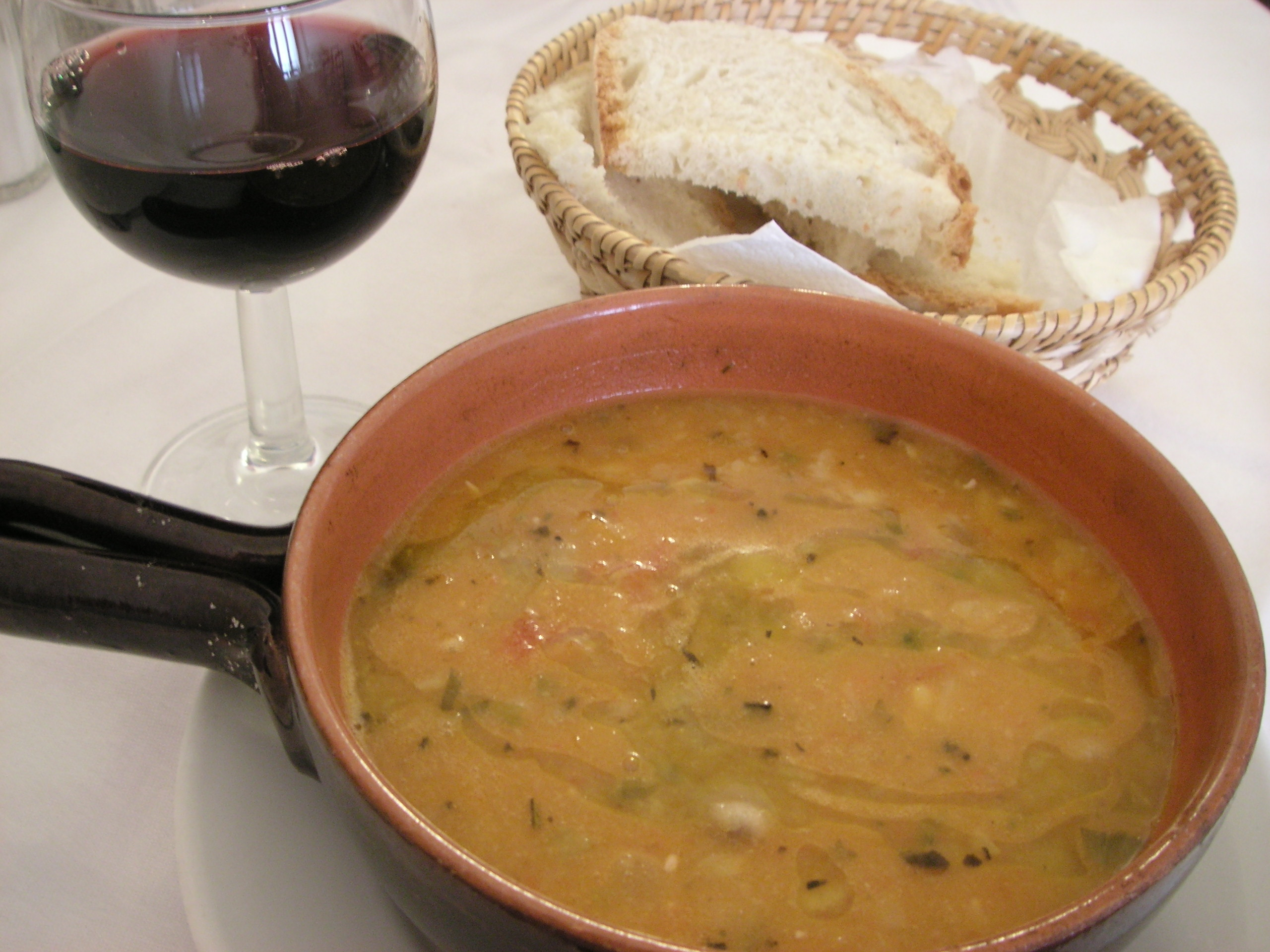
Acquacotta, bean, and minestrone

Acquacotta (Italian: [ˌakkwaˈkɔtta]; lit. 'cooked water') is an Italian broth-based bread soup that was originally a peasant food. Its preparation and consumption dates back to ancient history, and it originated in the coastal area known as the Maremma, in southern Tuscany and northern Lazio. The dish was invented in part as a means to make hardened, stale bread edible. In contemporary times, ingredients can vary, and additional ingredients are sometimes used. Variations of the dish include acquacotta con funghi and acquacotta con peperoni.

== Etymology ==
In Italian, the word acquacotta means 'cooked water'.

== History ==
Acquacotta is a traditional dish originating in Maremma, a coastal region of Italy which spans the southern half of Tuscany's coast and runs into northern Lazio. It was originally a peasant food, and has been described as an ancient dish, the recipe of which was derived in part by people who lived in the Tuscan forest working as colliers (charcoal burners), who were typically very poor, being "traditionally among the poorest of people". It was also prepared and consumed by farmers and shepherds in the Maremma area. (Note: "Acquacotta means "cooked water", but once you've tasted the sweet rich vegetable flavors of this country soup, you may well wonder why it got its name. For centuries it has been the everyday meal of shepherds and charcoal burners of the ...") Historically, the soup was sometimes served as an antipasto dish, the first course in an Italian meal. It remains a popular dish in Maremma and throughout Italy.

Acquacotta was invented in part as a means to make stale, hardened bread edible. People that worked away from home for significant periods of time, such as woodcutters and shepherds, would bring bread and other foods with them (such as pancetta and salt cod) to hold them over. Acquacotta was prepared and used to marinate the stale bread, thus softening it.

A legend about acquacotta exists in relation to the concept of Stone Soup, which is generally based upon a premise of a poor traveler who arrived at a village having only a stone, but convinced the villagers to add ingredients to his stone soup, creating acquacotta; variations of the legend exist.

=== Historical ingredients ===
Historically, acquacotta's primary ingredients were water, stale bread, onion, tomato, and olive oil, along with various vegetables and leftover foods that may have been available. In the earlier 1800s, some preparations used agresto, a juice derived from half-ripened grapes, in place of tomatoes, which were not a common food in Italy prior to "the latter decades of the nineteenth century".

== In contemporary times ==
Contemporary preparations of acquacotta may use stale, fresh, or toasted bread, and can include additional ingredients such as vegetable broth, eggs, cheeses such as Parmesan and pecorino toscano, celery, garlic, basil, beans such as cannellini beans, cabbage, kale, lemon juice, salt, pepper, potatoes, and others. Some versions may use edible mushrooms such as porcini, wild herbs, and leaf vegetables and greens such as arugula, endive, mint, chard, chicory, dandelion greens, watercress, valerian, and others. As the greens boil down, they contribute to the broth's flavor. The dish may be topped with a poached egg. Contemporary versions may be prepared in advance from a few hours to a day, stored in a cold place or refrigerated, and then reheated prior to serving. It can also be preserved by freezing.

== Variations ==
Acquacotta con funghi is an acquacotta soup variation that uses porcini mushrooms as a primary ingredient. Additional ingredients include bread, stock or water, tomato conserva, Parmesan cheese, eggs, mentuccia, wild mint, garlic, olive oil, salt, and pepper. This variation's flavor and aroma has been described as based upon the porcini mushrooms that are used; parsley may also be used.

Acquacotta con peperoni is an acquacotta soup variation that includes celery, red pepper, and garlic.

== See also ==
- List of Italian soups
- Bread soup
