= Katemeshi =

Japanese peasant food

Katemeshi, also spelled katé-meshi, was a common peasant food in Japan during the Meiji and Taishō periods (1867–1924). Some laborers and farmers subsisted on the dish during this time, whereas wealthier people consumed larger quantities of rice, which was a relatively expensive food compared to the income of some workers. Typical ingredients in the dish included rice, barley, millet, and chopped daikon (a mild winter radish). Variations of the dish were based upon the regional and seasonal availability of foods in different areas of Japan.

== History ==
Katemeshi was a rice dish, peasant food and former staple food in Japanese cuisine that was common during the Meiji and Taishō periods of Japan. (Note: "katemeshi, combining rice with daikon, was a common everyday staple...") During this time, rice was an expensive food for laborers, and some employers fed their workers katemeshi, while feeding themselves with significantly larger quantities of rice and separate side dishes. (Note: "For example, during the Taishō period (1912–1926) an average 27 percent of the budget of laborers was spent on rice.") Some farmers in rural Japan also subsisted on katemeshi, whereas merchants and (former) samurai who lived in cities consumed larger quantities of rice. (Note: "While samurai and merchants in cities ate rice, farmers lived on kate meshi, a mixture of rice, barley, hie (barnyard millet), awa (foxtail millet), and the like. (The ratio of rice to other grains was one to five.)")

== Preparation ==
Typical ingredients in the preparation of katemeshi included rice, barley, millet, chopped daikon radish root and leaves, and other greens. The use of daikon in the dish was very common. Various additional ingredients were also used in the dish in regional areas of Japan, based upon food availability. In the Mie prefecture of Japan, potato leaves were used in addition to daikon. In Eastern Japan, white potatoes were used as an ingredient in katemeshi, and in Western Japan, sweet potatoes were used. Edible seaweeds such as hijiki and wakame were used as ingredients in coastal areas.

Tofu and okara, which is a leftover pulp by-product from tofu production, were sometimes used in katemeshi. Other ingredients used in the dish in various areas of Japan, when available, included wheat, carrots, turnips, burdock, taro, pumpkin, soybeans, mushrooms, kidney beans, and adzuki beans, among others.

== See also ==
- Gruel
- List of Japanese dishes
- List of rice dishes
