= Øllebrød =

Danish porridge

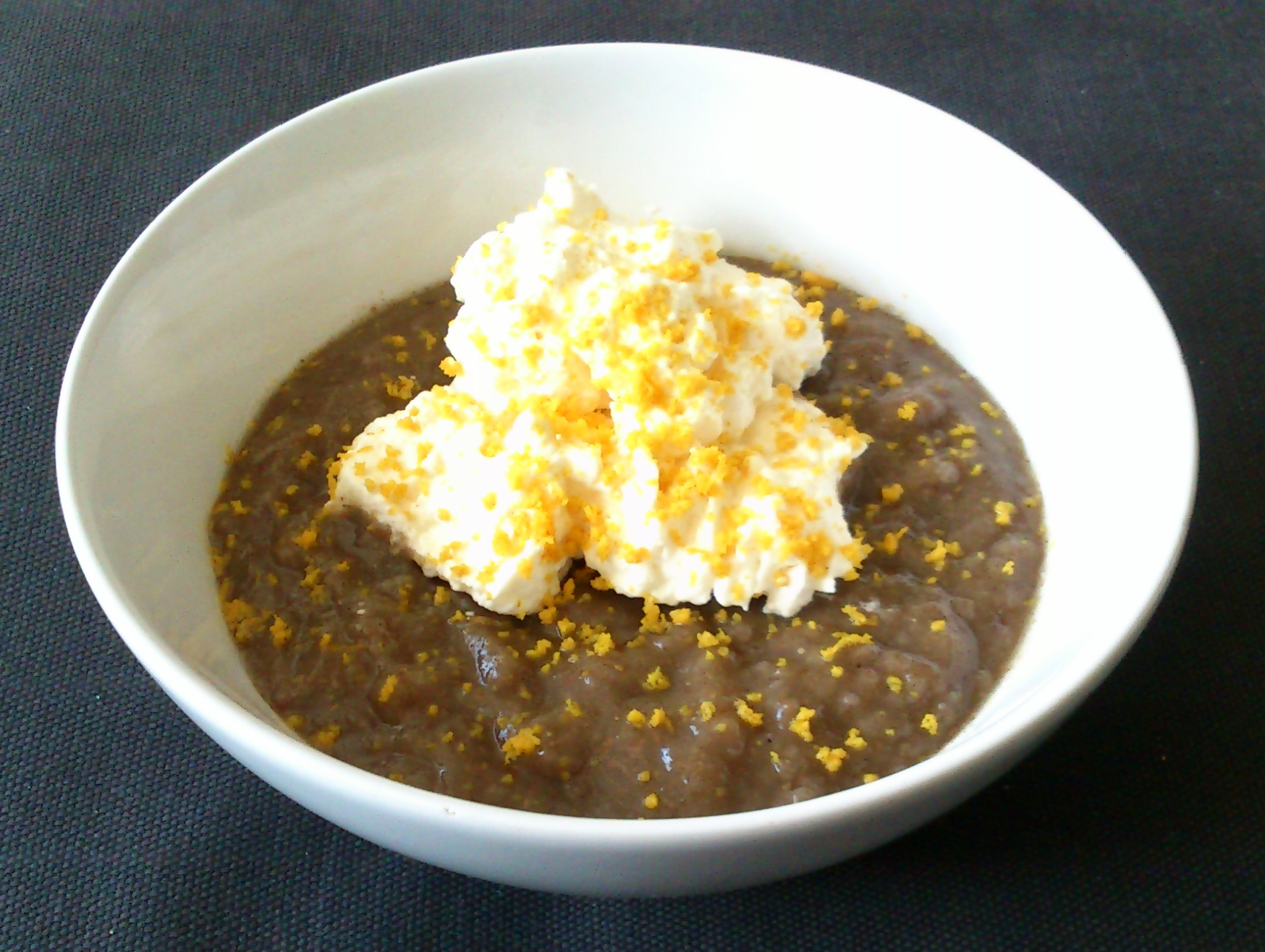
- Øllebrød, served with whipped cream.
- Type: Porridge, Bread soup
- Place of origin: Denmark
- Main ingredients: Rugbrød scraps, beer (possibly hvidtøl), water
- Variations: Sugar, lemon or orange

Øllebrød (lit. 'beer bread') is a traditional Danish dish. It is a porridge or thick bread soup made of sourdough rye bread (rugbrød) and beer (often hvidtøl). These ingredients give it a slightly tangy, caramelly, full taste. Øllebrød is common in Danish cuisine and is also part of Scanian cuisine, which was formerly a Danish province.

Øllebrød is typically eaten for breakfast during the winter, a par with oatmeal porridge. It is regarded as easily digestible and nourishing and frequently served in hospitals and retirement homes. Considered a thrifty dish, it is very rarely served at restaurants, but New Nordic Cuisine restaurants such as Noma and Agern (of chef Claus Meyer) have offered gourmet versions.

== History ==
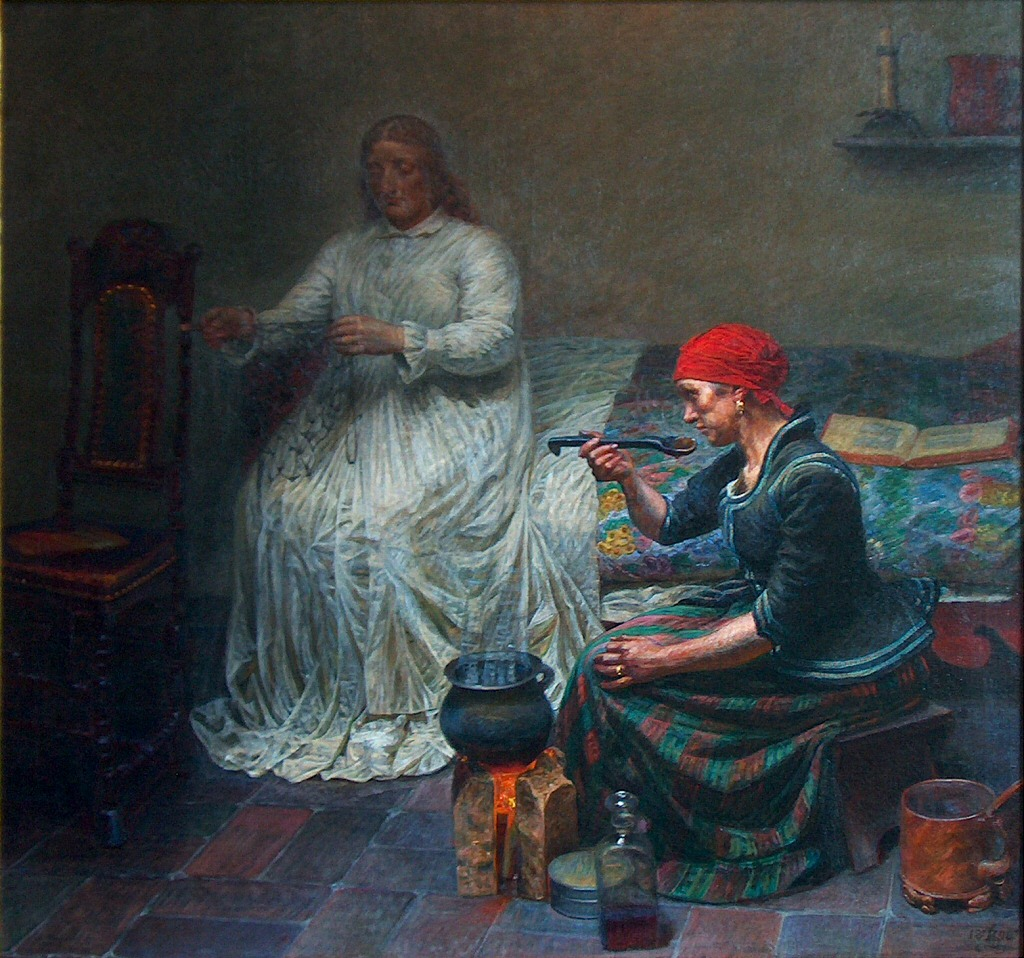
A woman preparing øllebrød in the foreground of Kristian Zahrtmann's painting Leonora Christina i Blåtårn, 1896

Øllebrød has its origins in the Middle Ages, as a practical meal using shelf-stable ingredients and food scraps. A morning meal became more popular during the 13th century in Denmark, and the dish was part of an emerging breakfast culture. It is likely that øllebrød evolved from a simple bread dipped in warm beer, to become a more refined porridge.

The dish was reportedly not well liked, but simply an economical way to make use of bread scraps. Nevertheless, it was consumed by all classes, having reportedly been a staple of the court of King Christian III during the 16th century.

== Ingredients ==
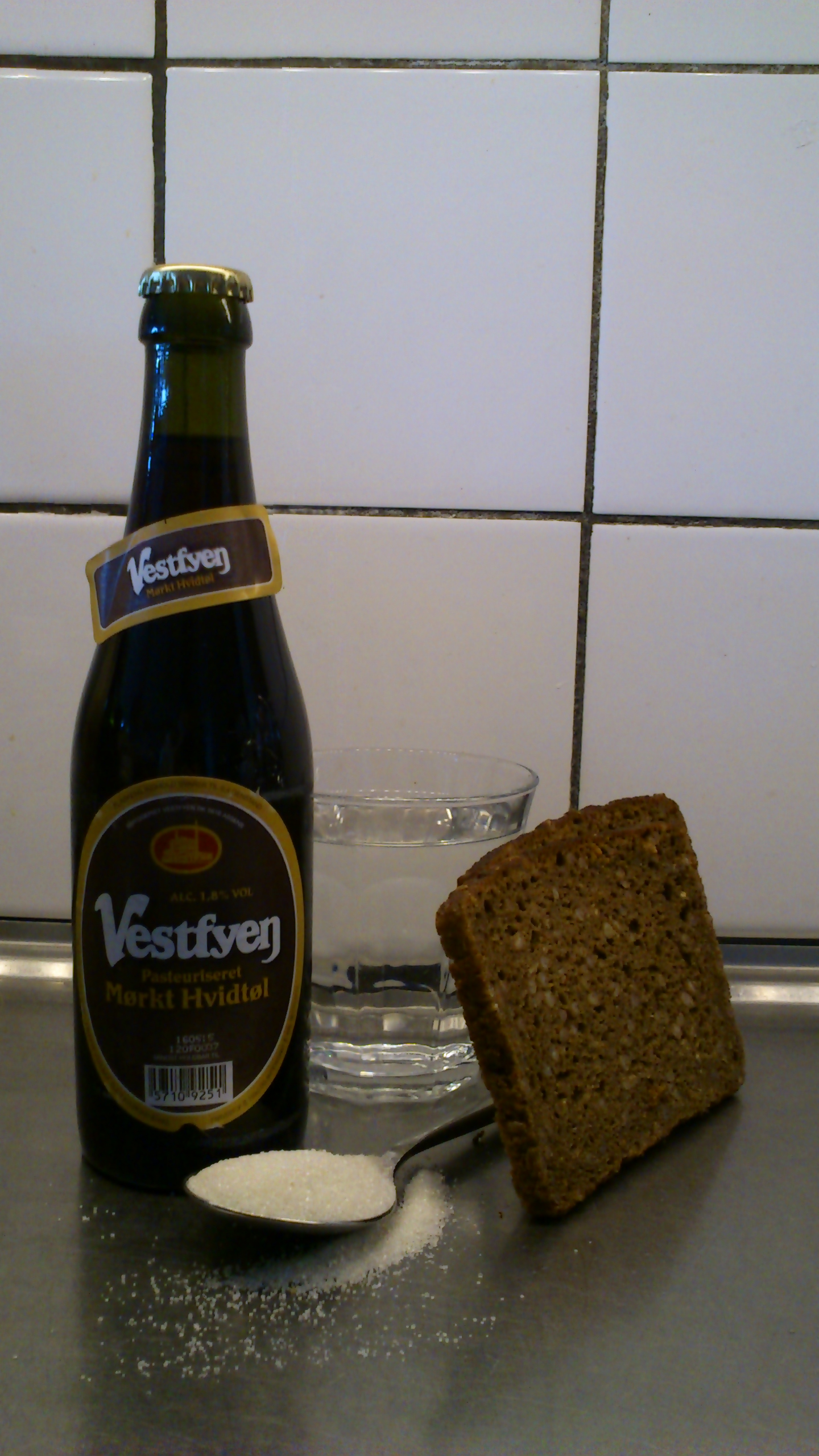
Typical ingredients used to make Øllebrød: Rugbrød, Hvidtøl, and sugar

Traditionally, øllebrød was made using leftover rye bread scraps, including hard end crusts that otherwise would be discarded. The bread would be soaked in water overnight before being boiled with hvidtøl. It is best made of traditional rye bread of fine-ground flour. Since the 1970s, whole-grain rye bread, or rye bread with whole sunflower seeds, pumpkin seeds or similar, have become increasingly popular, but the grains or seeds will make a lumpy øllebrød, unless it is puréed with a blender or passed through a sieve.

Formerly, øllebrød would be served unsweetened and could be part of all meals of the day. Today, it is often made using fresh rye bread and sweetened with sugar. It is eaten for breakfast with milk, cream, whipped cream, or an egg yolk beaten with sugar. Some modern variations also spice it with lemon peel, orange peel or vanilla, but many Danes disapprove of this since øllebrød is (by most) not regarded as a dessert.

Instant powder mixes, consisting of dried rye bread and sugar, have become commercially available. These mixes are similar to ymerdrys, differing only by a more fine ground content.

== Variations ==
A Norwegian dish exists of the same name, but is made of wheat flour, milk, beer, and sugar. It's a paler porridge, by comparison and is very rarely eaten today. In Denmark, it is called norsk øllebrød (Norwegian øllebrød). The Finnish porridge mämmi is also a similar traditional dish, made of barley malt.

== See also ==
- Danish cuisine
- List of porridges
