= Minestrone =

Thick soup of Italian origin

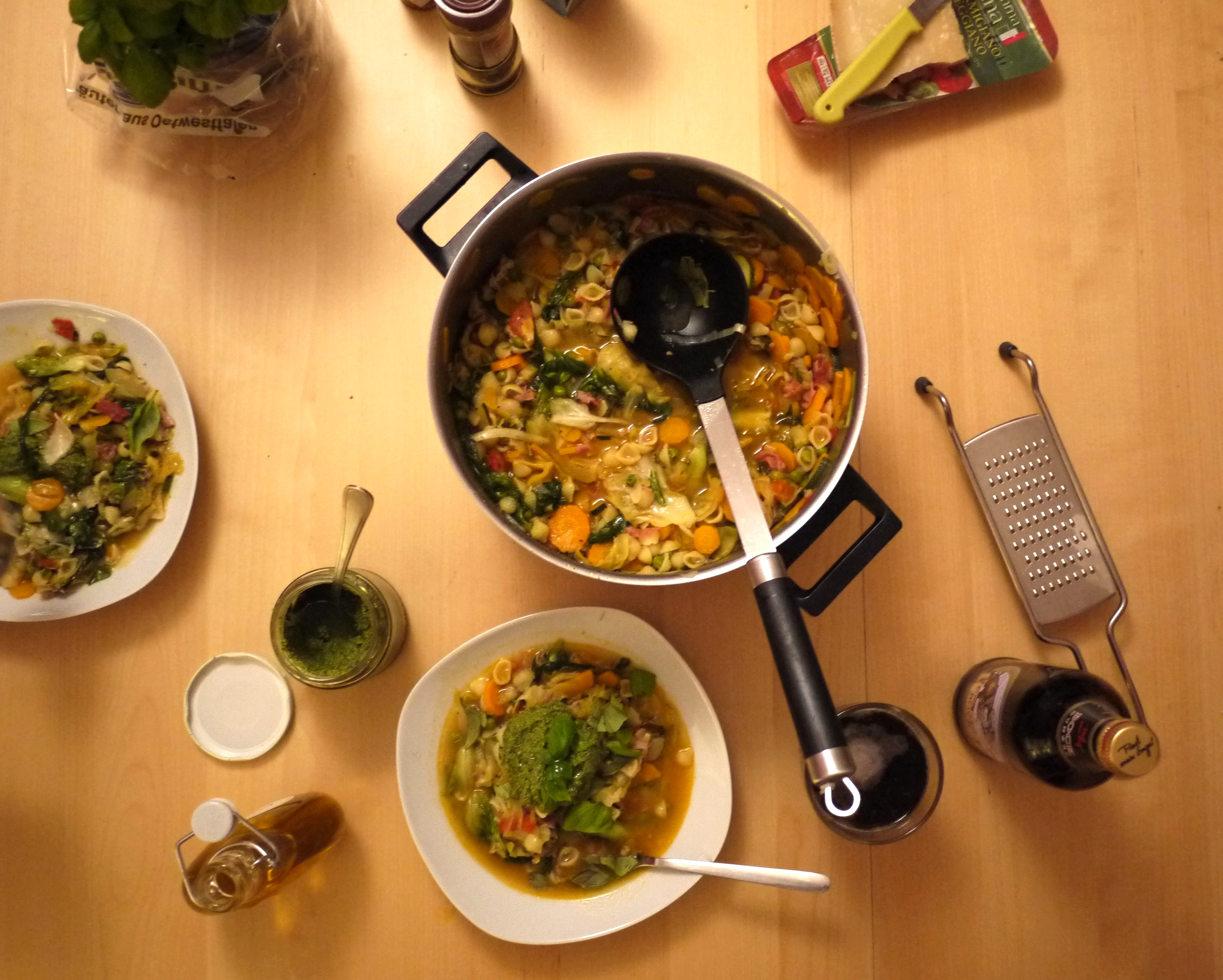
- Homemade minestrone
- Alternative names: Minestrone di verdure
- Type: Vegetable soup
- Course: Primo (Italian course)
- Place of origin: Italy
- Main ingredients: Onions, carrots, celery, potatoes, cabbage, tomatoes, courgettes, legumes (beans, chickpeas, fava beans)
- Ingredients generally used: Pasta, rice

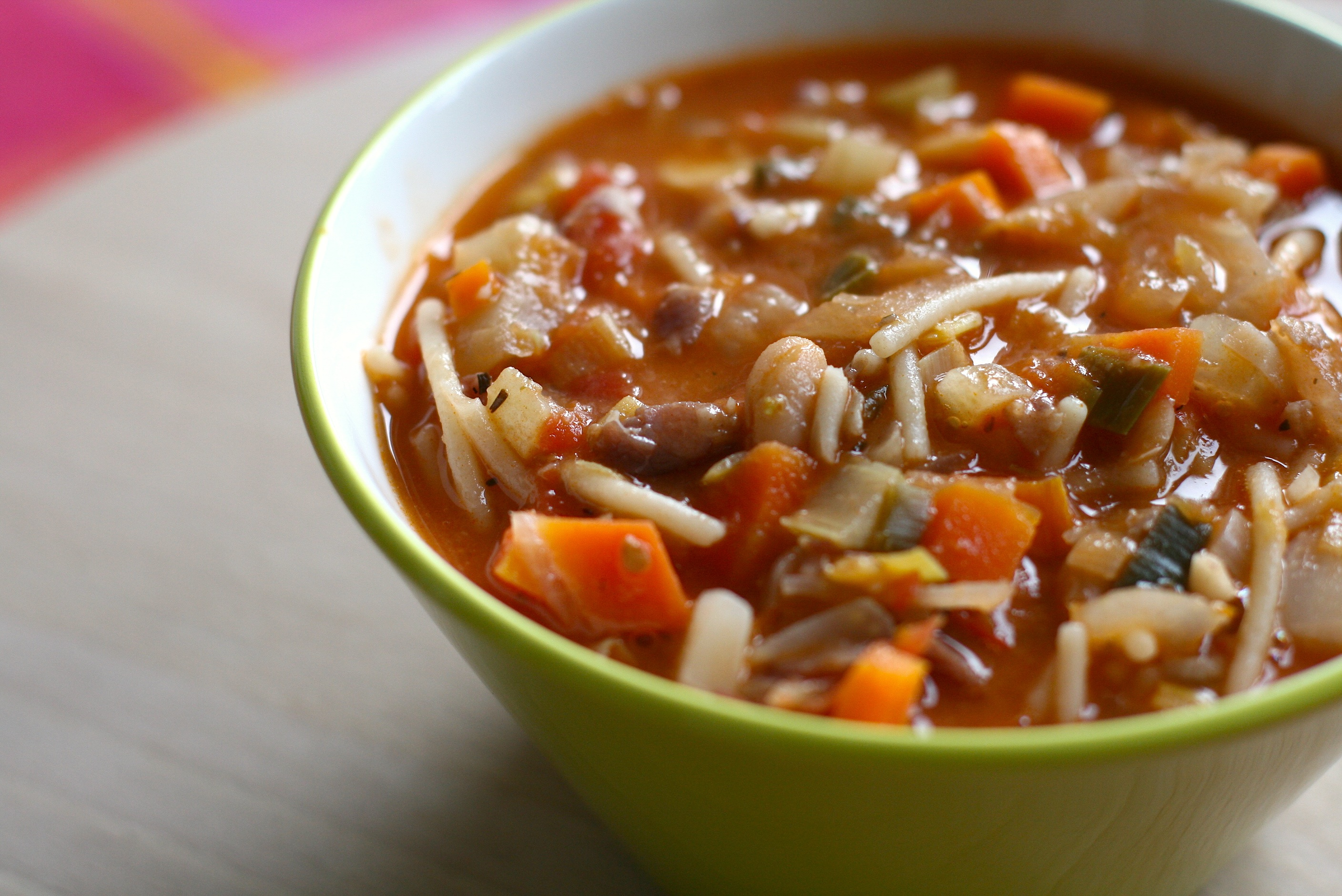
Minestrone

Minestrone (/ˌmɪnɪˈstroʊni/ MIN-ist-ROH-nee, Italian: [mineˈstroːne]) or minestrone di verdure is a thick vegetable soup of Italian origin. It typically includes onions, carrots, celery, potatoes, cabbage, tomatoes, courgettes, often legumes, such as beans, chickpeas or fava beans, and sometimes pasta or rice, and is characterized by the mixture of different vegetables and not very fine pieces (otherwise it is called passato di verdure). Minestrone is traditionally made without meat, but it has no precise recipe and can be made with many different ingredients.

== Etymology ==
The word minestrone, meaning a thick vegetable soup, is attested in English from 1871. It is from the Italian minestrone, the augmentative form of minestra, 'soup', or more literally 'that which is served', from minestrare, 'to serve', and cognate with administer as in 'to administer a remedy'.

Because of its unique origins and the absence of a fixed recipe, minestrone varies widely across Italy depending on traditional cooking times, ingredients, and season. It ranges from a thick and dense texture with very boiled-down vegetables to a more brothy soup with large quantities of diced and lightly cooked vegetables; it may also include meats.

In modern Italian, there are three words corresponding to the English word soup: zuppa, which is used in the sense of tomato soup, or fish soup; minestra, which is used in the sense of a more substantial soup such as a vegetable soup, and also for "dry" soups, namely pasta dishes; and minestrone, which means a very substantial or large soup or stew, although the meaning has now come to be associated with this particular dish.

== History ==
Some of the earliest origins of minestrone predate the expansion of the Latin tribes of Rome into what became the Roman Kingdom (later Roman Republic and Empire), when the local diet was "vegetarian by necessity" and consisted mostly of vegetables, such as onions, lentils, cabbage, garlic, fava beans, mushrooms, carrots, asparagus, and turnips.

During this time, the main dish of a meal would have been pulte, a simple but filling porridge of spelt flour cooked in salt water, to which whatever vegetables that were available would have been added.

It was not until the 2nd century BC, when Rome had conquered Italy and monopolized the commercial and road networks, that a huge diversity of products flooded the capital and began to change their diet, and by association, the diet of Italy, most notably with the more frequent inclusion of meats, including as a stock for soups.

Spelt flour was also removed from soups, as bread had been introduced into the Roman diet by the Greeks, and pulte became a meal largely for the poor.

The ancient Romans recognized the health benefits of a simple or "frugal" diet (from the Latin fruges, the common name given to cereals, vegetables, and legumes) and thick vegetable soups and vegetables remained a staple.

Marcus Apicius's ancient cookbook De Re Coquinaria described polus, a Roman soup dating back to 30 AD made of farro, chickpeas, and fava beans, with onions, garlic, lard, and greens thrown in.

As eating habits and ingredients changed in Italy, so did minestrone. Apicius updates the pultes and pulticulae with fancy trimmings such as cooked brains and wine. After the introduction of tomatoes to Italy from the New World in the 15th century, the plant was included as an ingredient in minestrone.

The tradition of not losing rural roots continues today, and minestrone is now known in Italy as belonging to the style of cooking called cucina povera ('cuisine of the poor'), meaning dishes that have rustic, rural roots, as opposed to cucina nobile ('cuisine of the nobles'), or the cooking style of the aristocracy and nobles.

== Regional variations ==
Minestrone alla genovese is a variant typical of Liguria which makes greater use of herbs, including pesto.

Imbakbaka or mbakbaka is a type of stew in Libya made with pasta, chickpeas, bzar spice, and meat. It originated through Italian colonization.

== See also ==
Media related to Minestrone at Wikimedia Commons

- List of Italian soups
- List of legume dishes
- List of vegetable soups
- Pasta e fagioli
- Ribollita
