= Açorda =

Portuguese bread soup

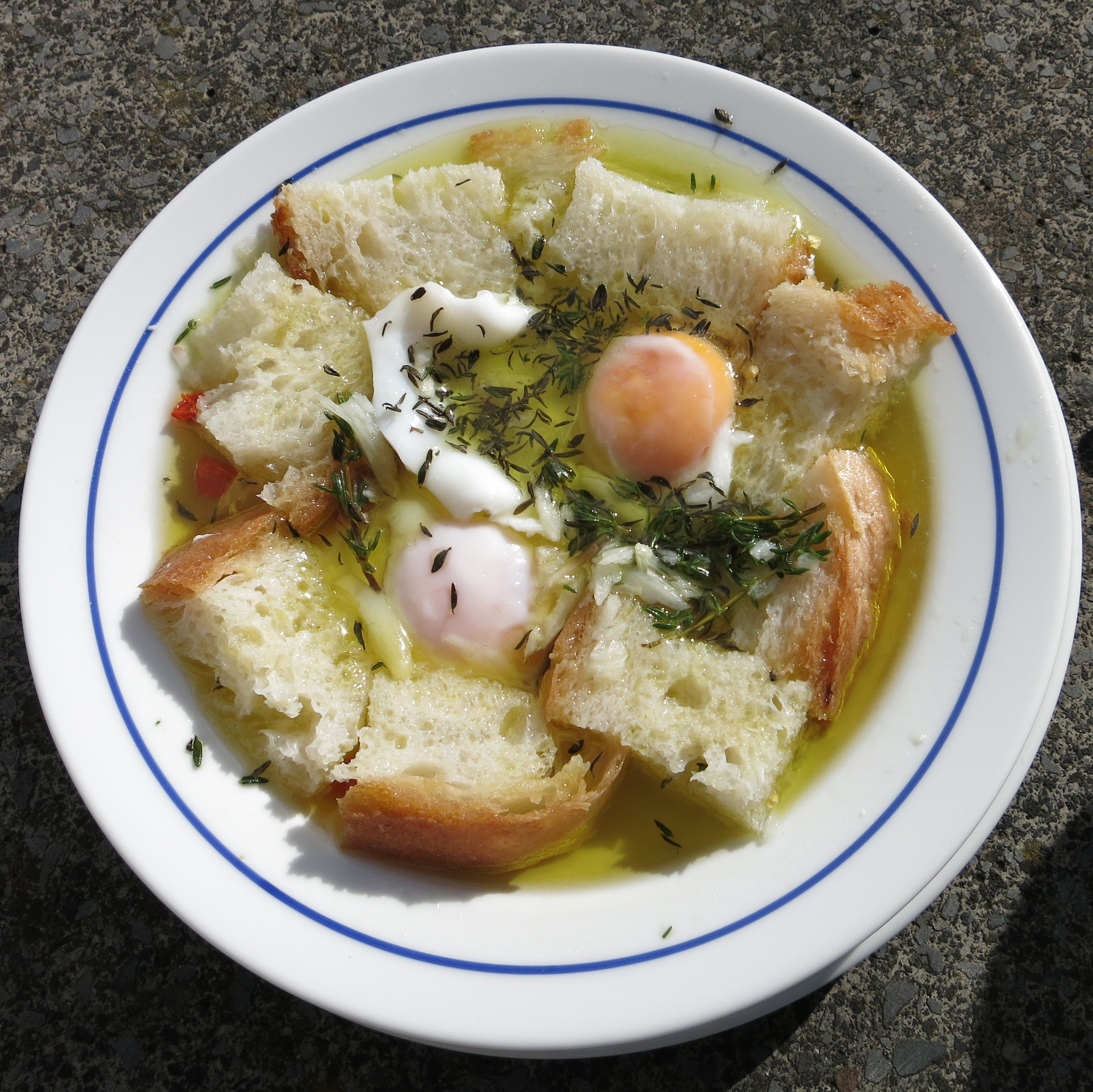
- Açorda
- Type: Bread soup
- Course: Main course
- Place of origin: Portugal
- Associated cuisine: Portuguese
- Main ingredients: Bread, eggs, garlic, cilantro

Açorda is a traditional Portuguese dish composed of cubed or sliced stale bread with garlic, cilantro, and poached eggs. It is a type of bread soup, although some variants have a consistency closer to that of a porridge.

The version served in Alentejo, açorda à Alentejana, is a classic of the region's cuisine.

== History ==
One of the first designations of the term açorda is found in 16th-century playwright Gil Vicente's Farsa dos Almocreves: "Tendes uma voz tão gorda/ que parece alifante/ depois de farto de açorda". (Roughly: You have such a big voice/ that it sounds like an elephant/ after too much bread soup.)

The dish's origins are as a poverty food, intended to prevent waste by using leftover bread, that evolved into a classic of Portuguese and particularly Alentejan cuisine.

== Ingredients and variants ==
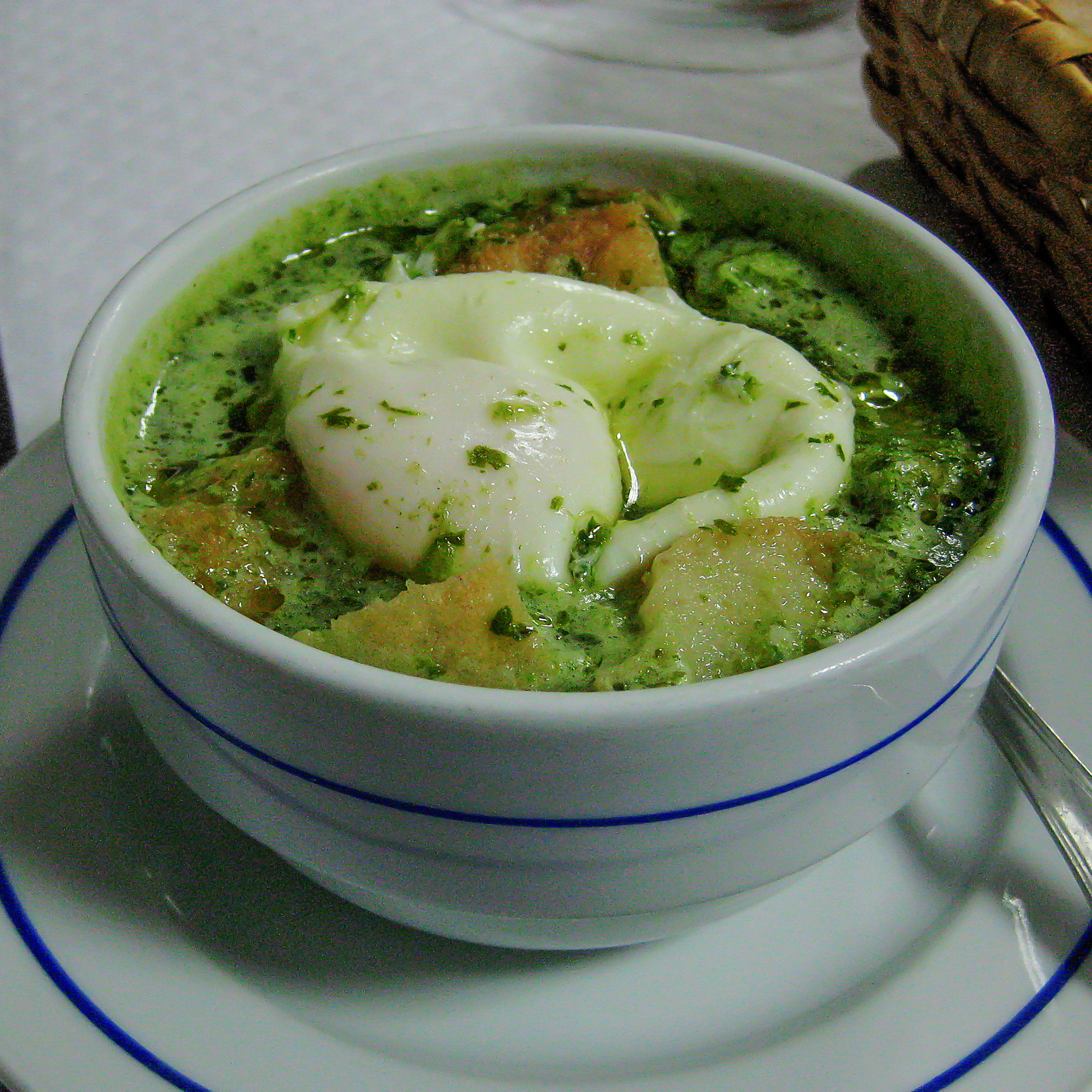
Açorda à Alentejana

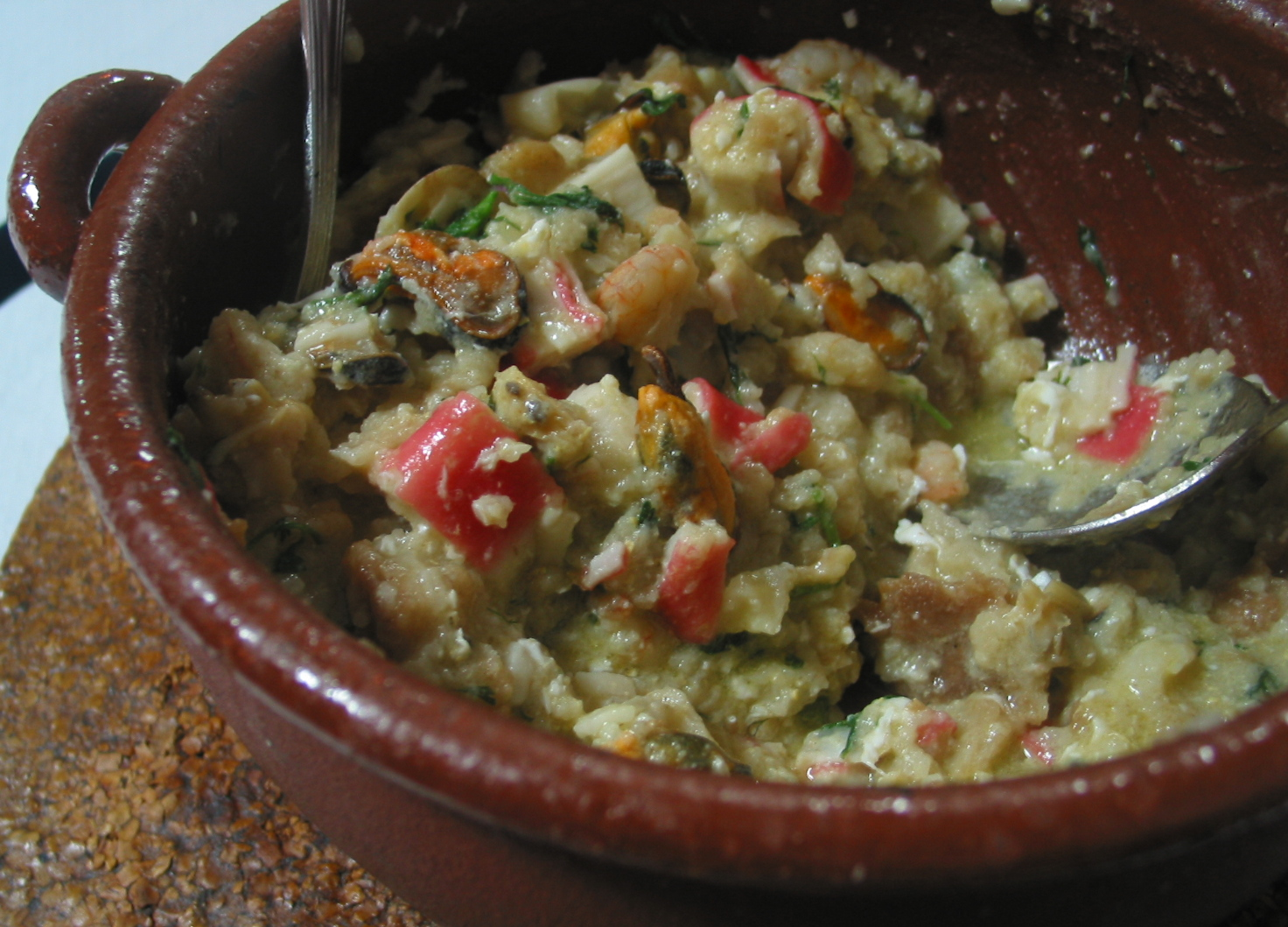
Porridge-like açorda de marisco, from Olhão

The dish is traditionally made with pao Alentejano.

Throughout Portugal there are multiple variants of garlic and cilantro bread soup; the most notable originated in Alentejo, where an açorda, also called açorda Alentejana or açorda à alentejana, has the consistency of a soup and is widely served in homes and restaurants throughout the region. According to Travel Magazine, it is "arguably Alentejo's signature dish". According to Publico it is an icon of Alentejan cuisine. Açorda à Alentejana was one of the finalist candidates for the 7 Wonders of Portuguese Gastronomy.

In other regions of Portugal the bread may be boiled in the broth and the dish may have a consistency similar to that of a porridge.

Other variations may include sausage, shrimp or codfish; the codfish version is called açorda de bacalhau. The version with shrimp is called açorda de marisco and is particularly popular in Lisbon. A version is known in Maccanese cuisine.

== Preparation ==
The dish is typically assembled from prepared ingredients rather than cooked, although some versions call for cooking the bread, cilantro, and garlic in the broth.

In a typical preparation the eggs are poached in salted water or stock. Garlic, cilantro and salt are mashed into a coarse paste with olive oil and vinegar, and the mixture is poured over the bread. The eggs are placed on the bread and the poaching liquid is poured over. The açorda is typically left to steep for a few minutes to soften the bread.

Some recipes call for coating the bread in the garlic-cilantro paste, then folding it into the eggs in their poaching liquid.

The final dish usually has a bright green color.

Preparation
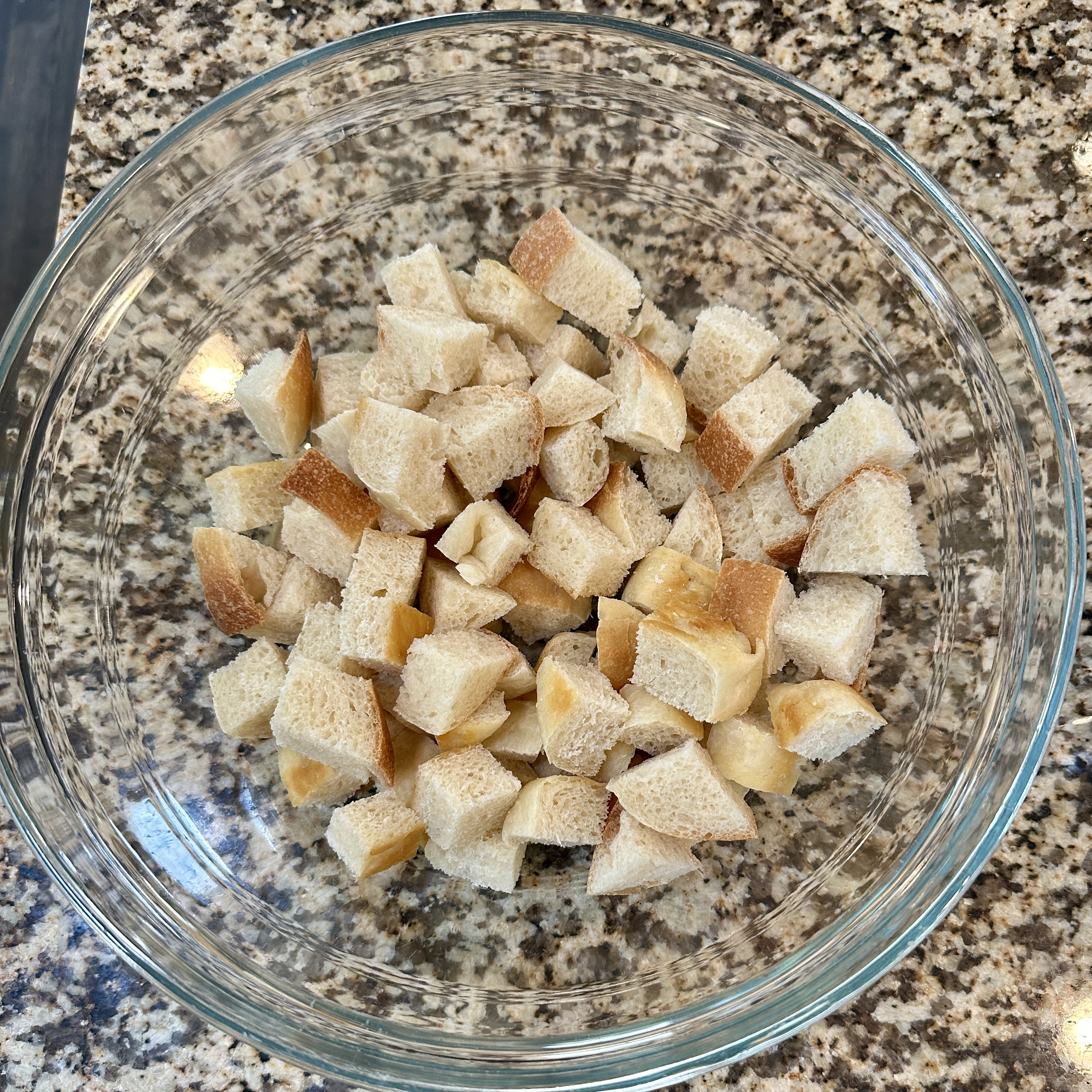
Stale bread is cubed or sliced

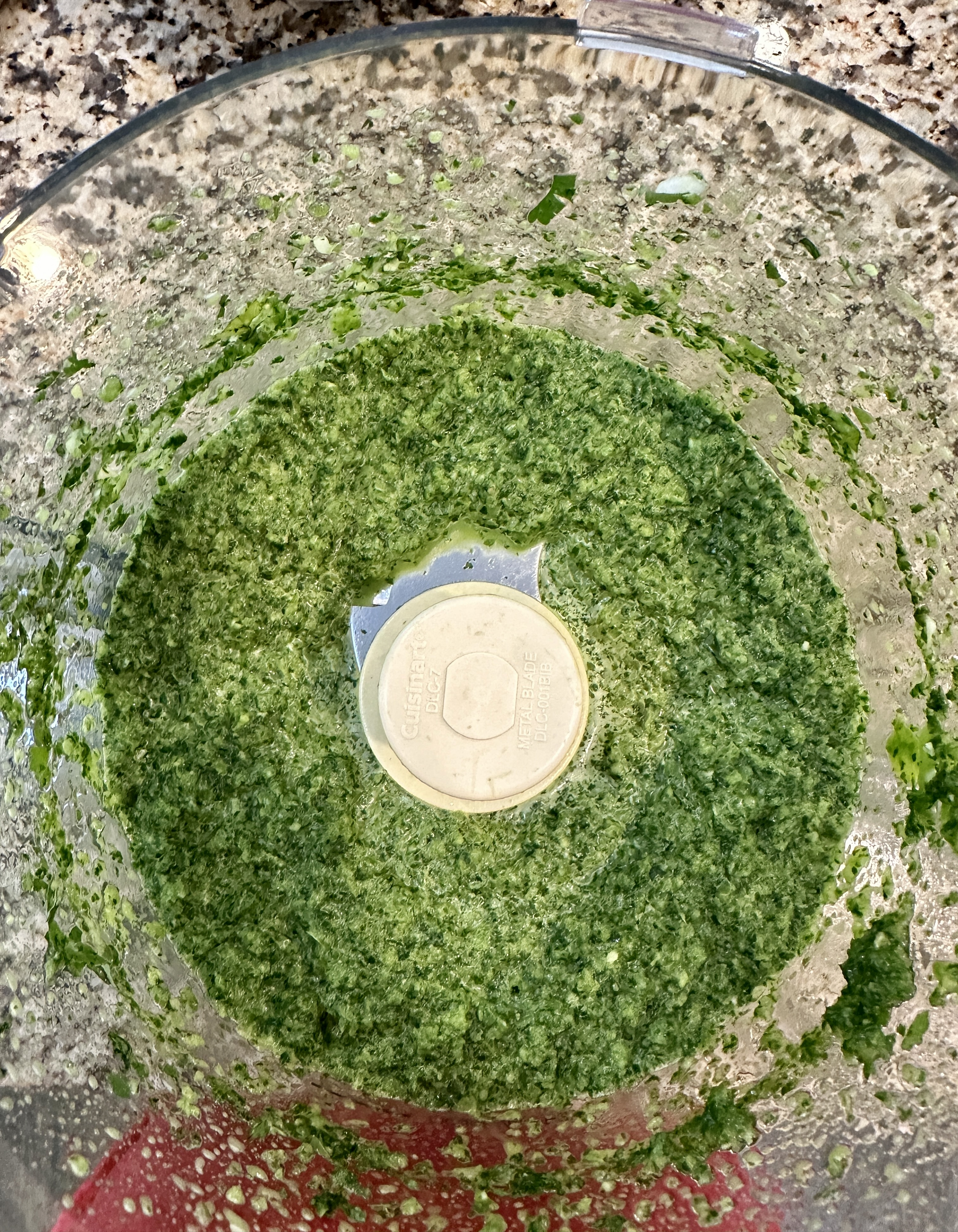
Cilantro and garlic are ground to a paste

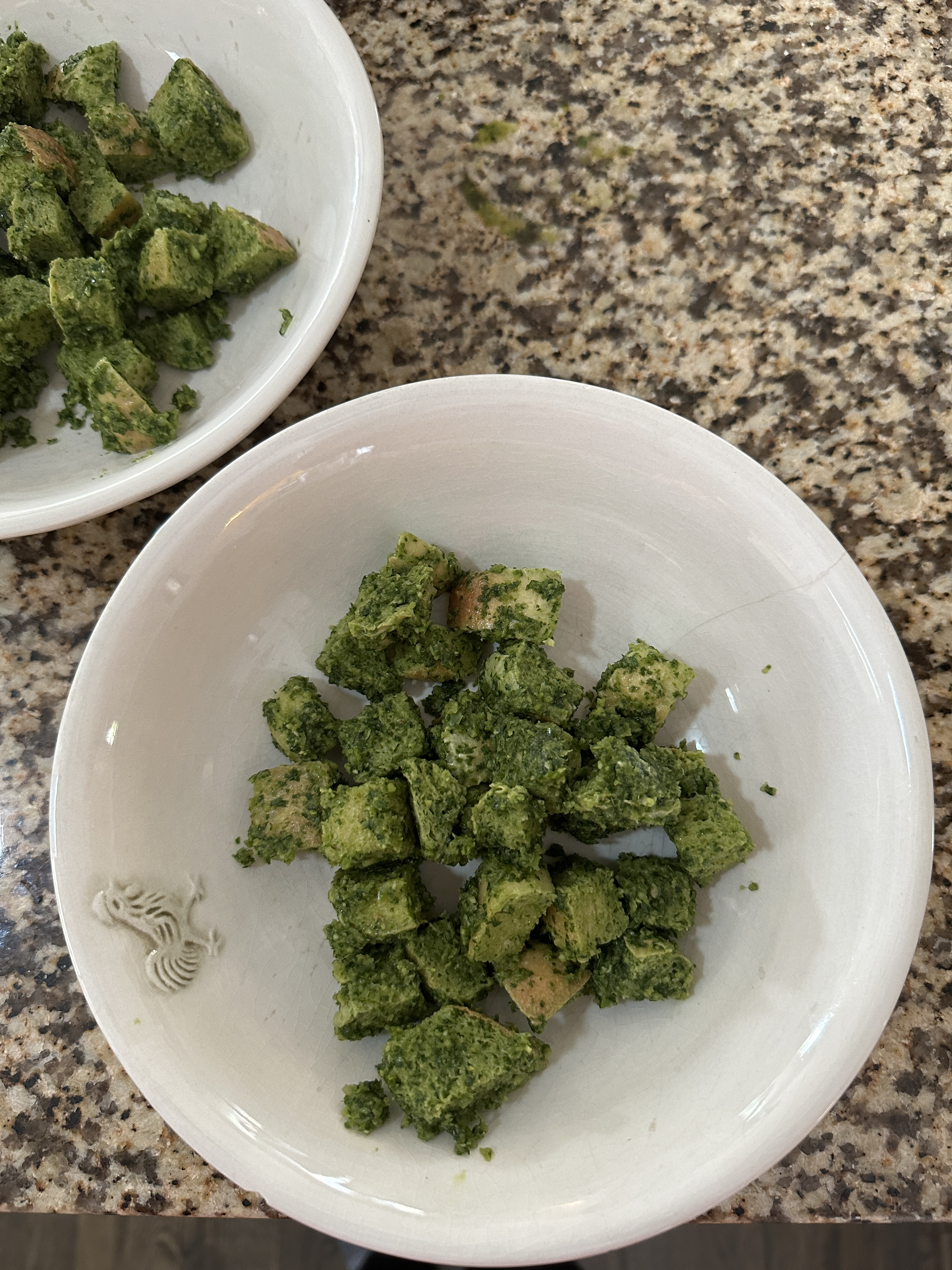
Bread is coated in cilantro-garlic paste and portioned into individual bowls

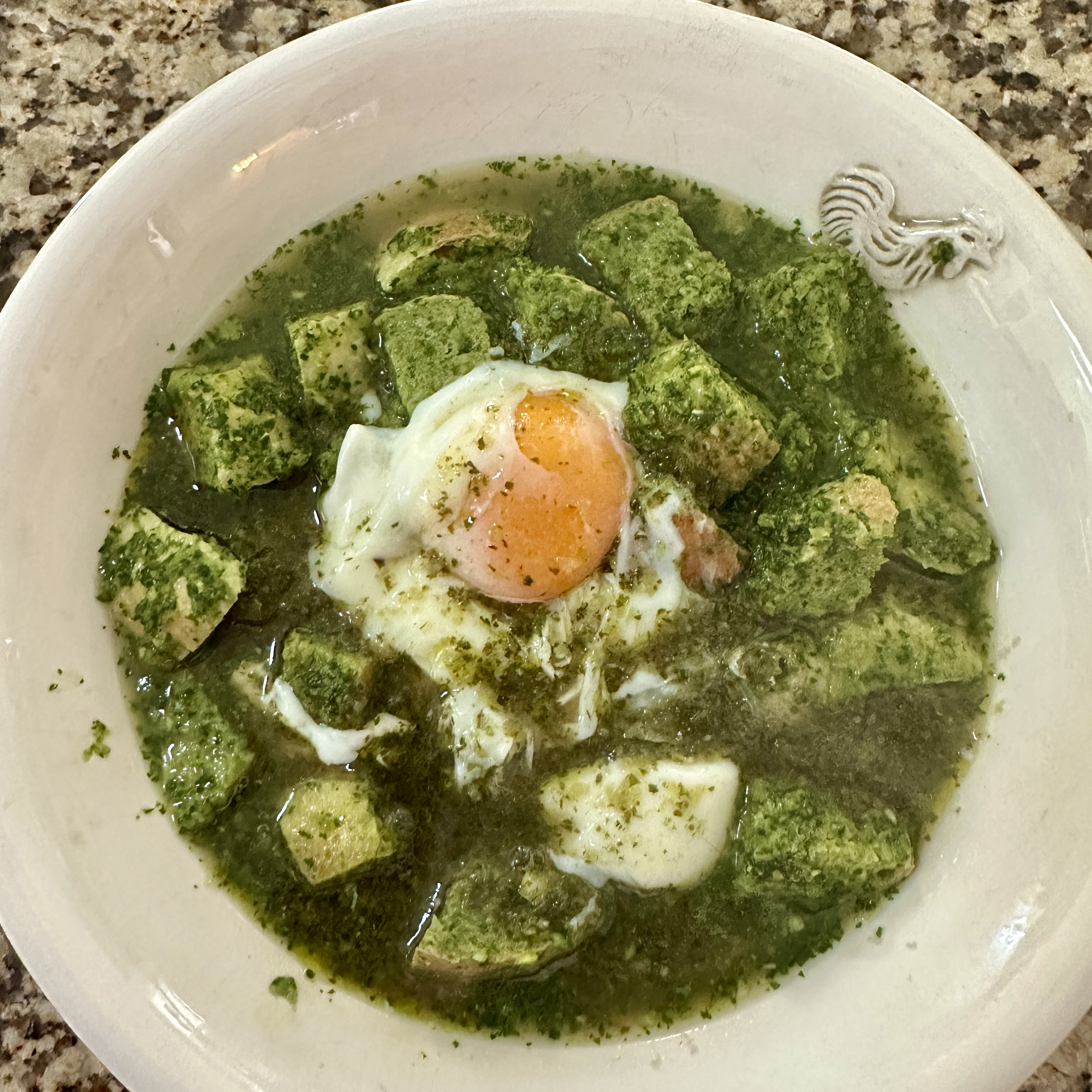
Broth and a poached egg completes the dish
