= Staling =

Process that makes bread less palatable

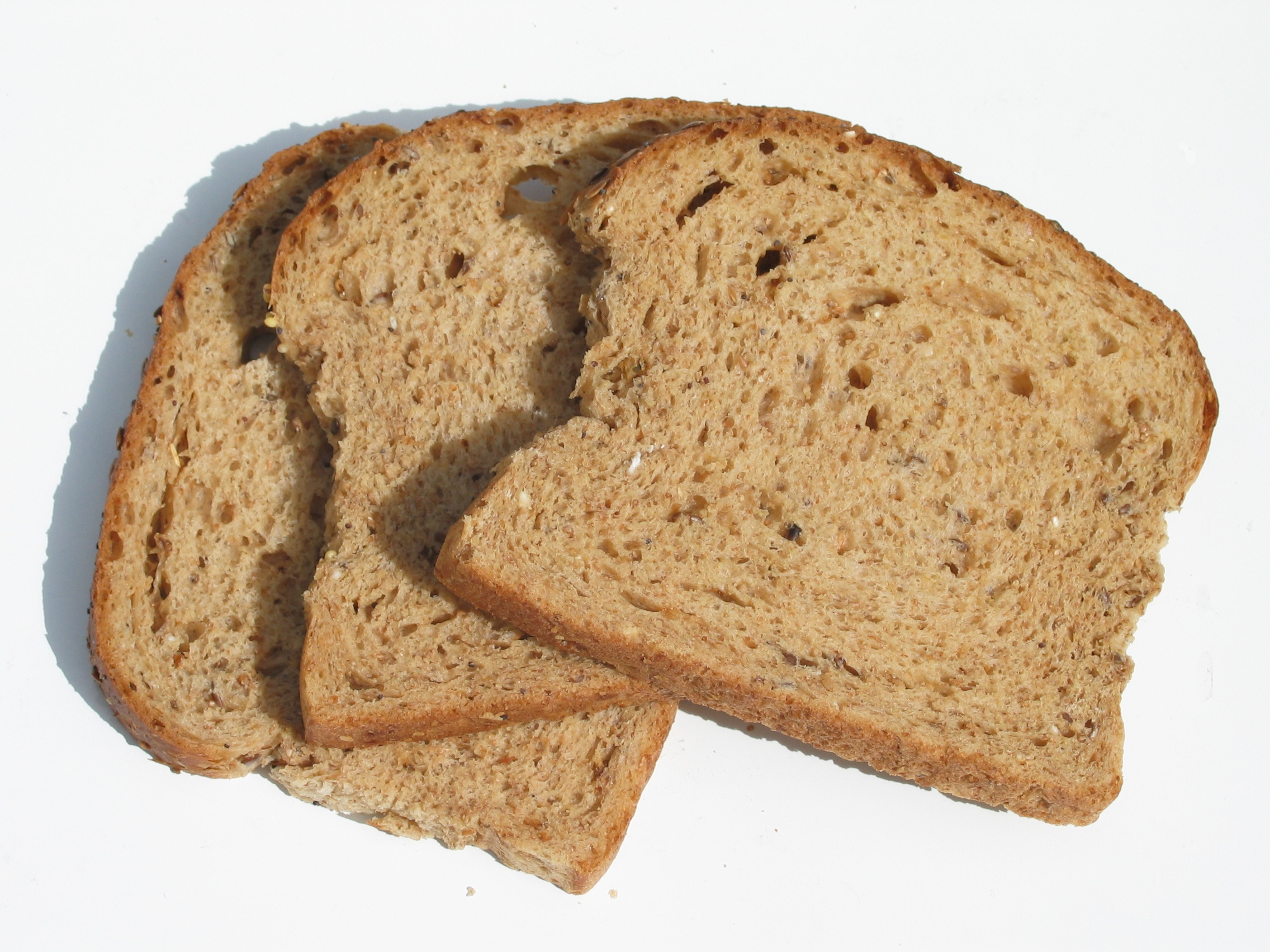
Stale bread

Staling, or "going stale", is a chemical and physical process in bread and similar foods that reduces their palatability. Stale bread is dry and hard, making it less suitable for different culinary uses than fresh bread. Countermeasures and destaling techniques may reduce staling.

== Mechanism and effects ==
Staling is a chemical and physical process in bread that reduces its palatability. Staling is not simply a drying-out process caused by evaporation. One important mechanism is the migration of moisture from the starch granules into the interstitial spaces, degelatinizing the starch; stale bread's leathery, hard texture results from the starch amylose and amylopectin molecules realigning and causing recrystallisation.

Stale bread is dry and hard. Bread will stale even in a moist environment and stales most rapidly at temperatures just above freezing. While bread that has been frozen when fresh may be thawed acceptably, contrary to popular belief, bread stored in a refrigerator will have increased staling rates. Staling alone does not make bread unsafe to eat. However, mold growth can make bread unsafe to eat. Mold growth can be slowed by refrigeration.

== Culinary uses ==
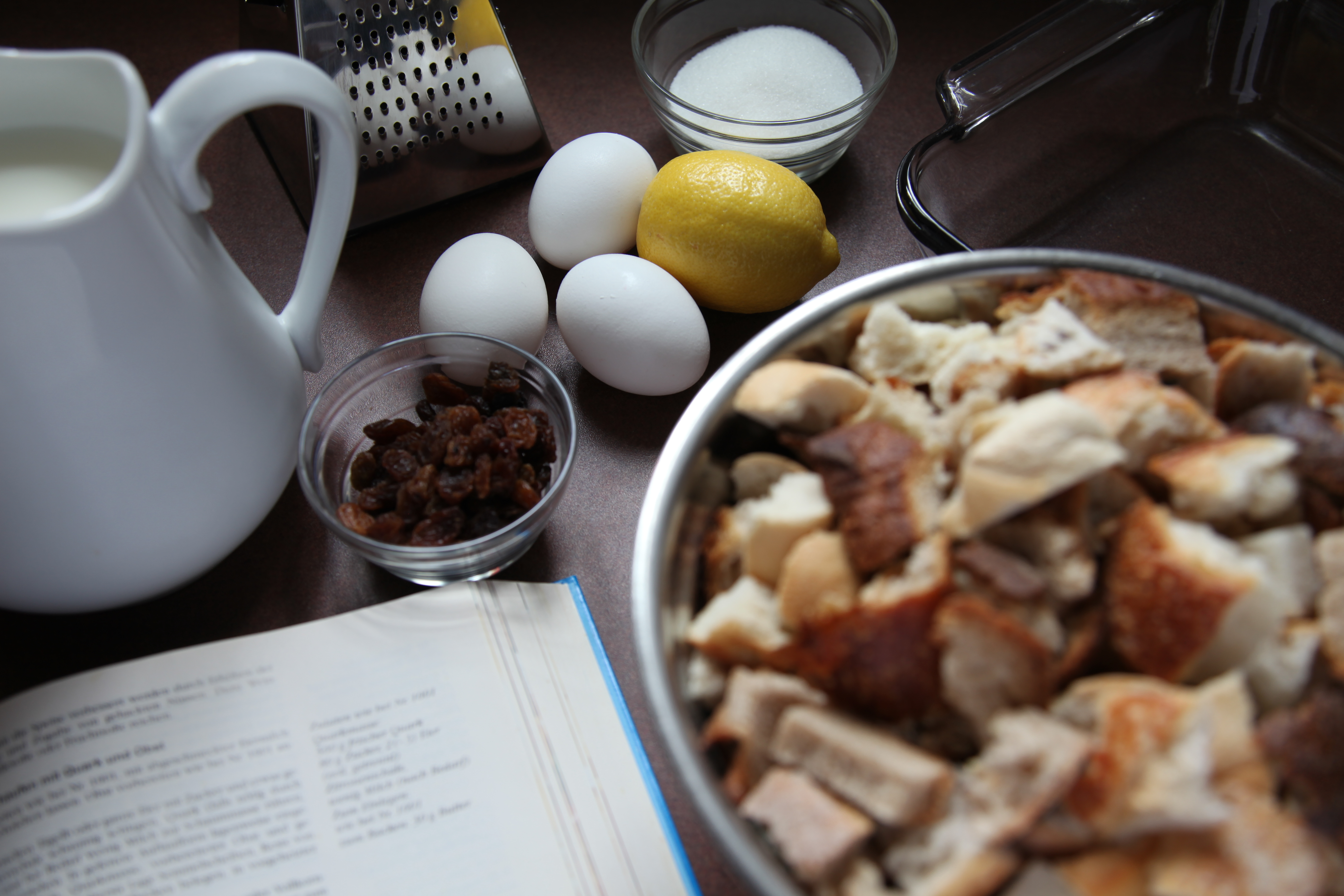
Ingredients for bread pudding, including pieces of stale bread

Many classic dishes rely upon otherwise unpalatable stale bread. Examples include bread sauce, bread dumplings, and flummadiddle, an early American savoury pudding. There are also many types of bread soups such as wodzionka (in Silesian cuisine) and ribollita (in Italian cuisine). An often-sweet dish is bread pudding. Cubes of stale bread can be dipped in cheese fondue or seasoned and baked in the oven to become croutons, suitable for scattering in salads or on top of soups. Slices of stale bread soaked in an egg and milk mixture and then fried are used for French toast (known in French as pain perdu 'lost bread'). In Spanish and Portuguese cuisines migas is a breakfast dish using stale bread and traditional gazpacho is a soup based on tomatoes puréed with olive oil and thickened with stale bread. In Tunisian cuisine lablabi is a soup of chickpeas and stale bread.

Stale bread or breadcrumbs made from it can be used to "stretch" meat in dishes such as haslet (a type of meatloaf in British cuisine, or meatloaf itself) and garbure (a stew in French cuisine). It can be a subsidiary ingredient in dishes such as fattoush (a type of salad in Levantine cuisine). Stale bread can be used as a base for dips such as skordalia (in Greek cuisine) or substituted for another ingredient.

In medieval cuisine, slices of stale bread, called trenchers, were used instead of plates.

== Countermeasures ==
Anti-staling agents used in modern bread include wheat gluten, enzymes, and glycerolipids, mainly monoglycerides and diglycerides. Stale bread can be partially made fresh again by heating to 60 °C (140 °F) in a conventional oven or microwave oven.
