= Ribollita =

Italian bread soup

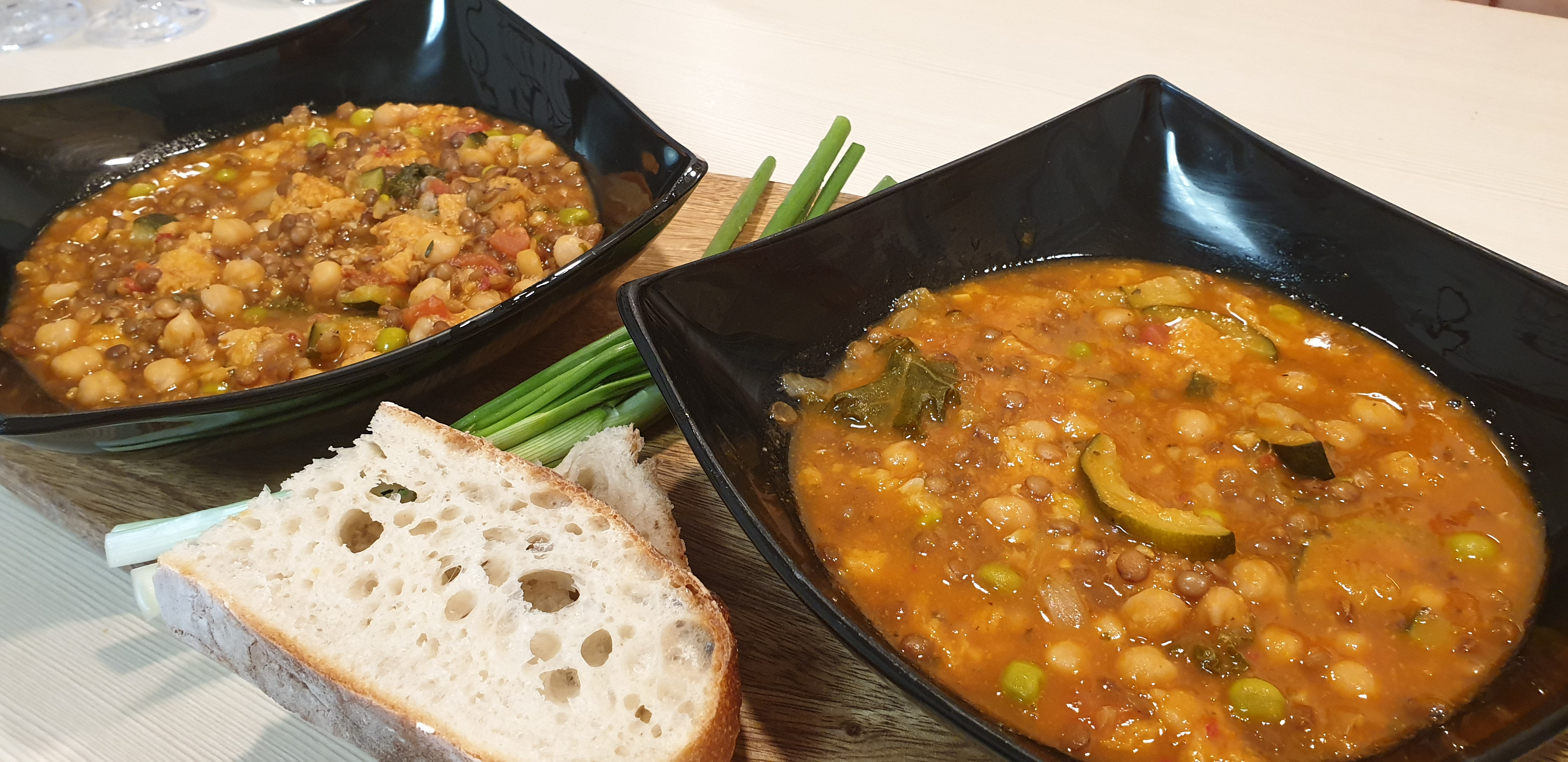
- Type: Bread soup
- Course: Primo (Italian course)
- Place of origin: Italy
- Region or state: Tuscany
- Main ingredients: Bread, cannellini beans, vegetables

Ribollita (lit. 'reboiled') is a Tuscan panade (a variety of bread soup) made with bread and vegetables, often from leftovers. There are many variations, but it usually contains cannellini beans, lacinato kale, cabbage and inexpensive vegetables such as carrot, beans, chard, celery, potatoes and onion. It is often baked in a clay pot.

Like most Tuscan cuisine, the soup has peasant origins. It was originally made by reheating (or reboiling) large amounts of minestrone or vegetable soup leftover from the previous day with stale bread. This occurred most frequently on Fridays, as it was eaten as a fasting food. Some sources date it to the Middle Ages, when the servants gathered up food-soaked bread trenchers from feudal lords' banquets and boiled them for their dinners. The dish is first documented in 1910, in L'arte cucinaria in Italia by Alberto Cougnet.

== See also ==
- List of Italian soups
- List of vegetable soups
- List of bread dishes
- Minestrone
