= Bread soup =

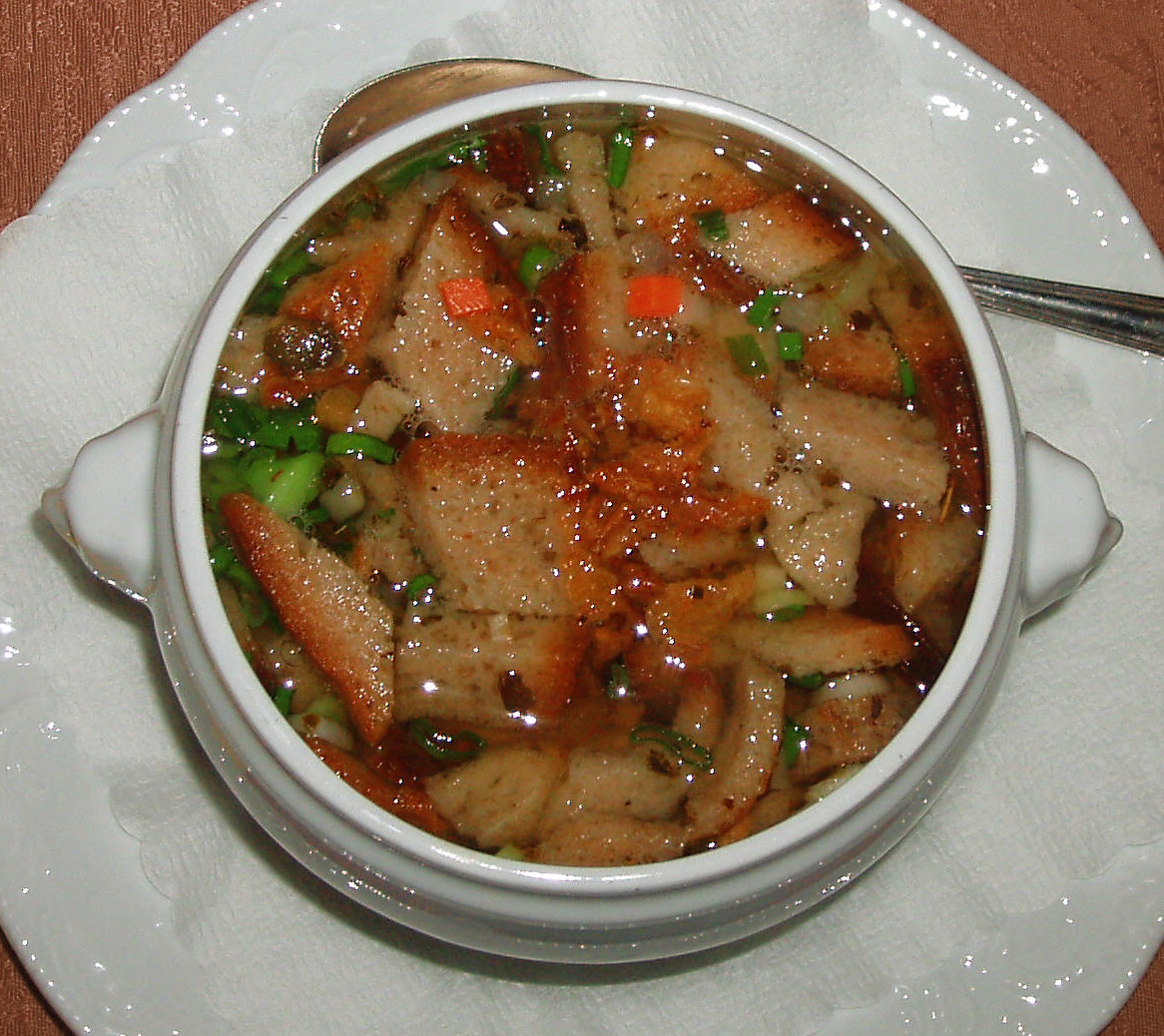
- German-style bread soup called Brotsuppe, served with herbs in a crock (2008)
- Type: Soup
- Course: Any, sometimes appetizer
- Place of origin: Unknown, possibly Central Europe; ancient/universal
- Serving temperature: Hot
- Main ingredients: Stale bread, broth, marjoram and other herbs, onions, spices, sometimes cream
- Variations: Millefanti

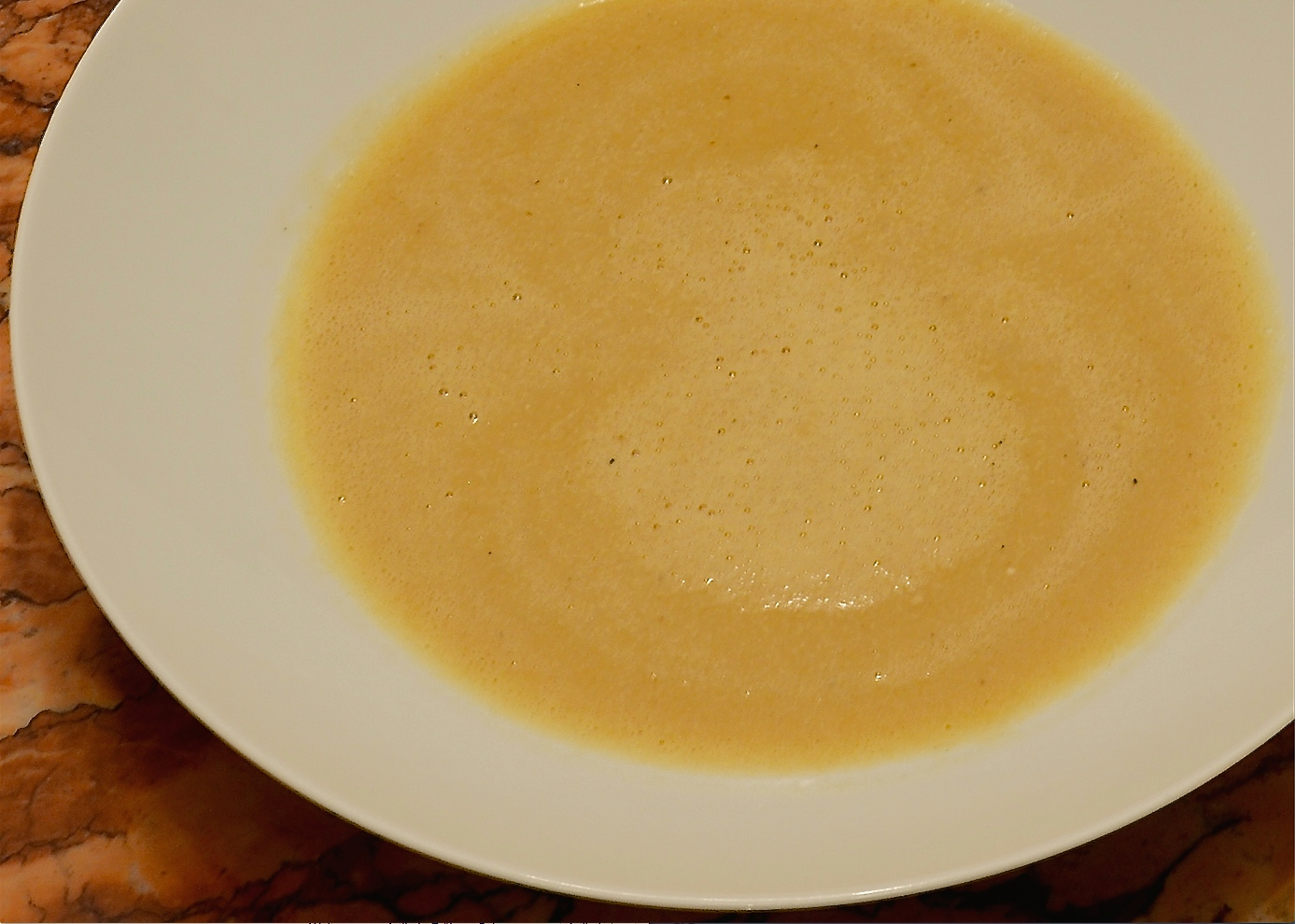
Bread soup with pureed brown bread, wine and cream from Vienna, Austria

Bread soup is a simple soup that mainly consists of bread, usually stale bread. Variations exist in many countries, and it is often eaten during Lent. Both brown and white bread may be used.

The basis for bread soup is traditionally either meat soup or vegetable broth. Less often it is made with fish broth. To prepare the dish, the bread is either cut into pieces and put directly into the broth, or it is cooked with onions and spices in a broth and then pureed.

Some versions add bacon, egg and cream, others liver sausage or blood sausage. A common version of the dish is prepared from the broth remaining from the steeping of sausage during home butchering of pigs. The soup is then traditionally seasoned with marjoram. An Italian variation, millefanti, also uses egg and Parmesan cheese. Some fine variations contain wine. Other more rustic versions contain malt or beer.

== Brewis ==
Brewis is a type of bread soup associated with the cuisine of Northern England. Originally a term for bread soaked in meat drippings, brewis came to be used for broths thickened with bread (or sometimes oatmeal). A similar dish in the cuisine of New England was made by softening rye bread or Boston brown bread with milk and maple syrup.

== Varieties ==
- Açorda in Portuguese cuisine
- Acquacotta, also known as pancotto, in Italian cuisine
- Pappa al pomodoro in Italian cuisine
- Ribollita in Italian cuisine
- Zuppa toscana in Italian cuisine
- Brotsuppe in German cuisine
- Konchol in Armenian cuisine
- Øllebrød in Danish cuisine
- Ajoblanco in Spanish cuisine
- Sopa de ajo in Spanish cuisine
- Soup pain in Haitian cuisine
- Tyurya in Russian cuisine
- Wodzianka in Polish cuisine (Silesia and Central Poland)
- Żurek in Polish cuisine
- Velija loksy in Slovak cuisine
- Paomo in Chinese cuisine
- Popara in Bulgarian cuisine

== See also ==
- List of bread dishes
- List of soups
- Toast water
