= Tyurya =

Russian cold bread soup

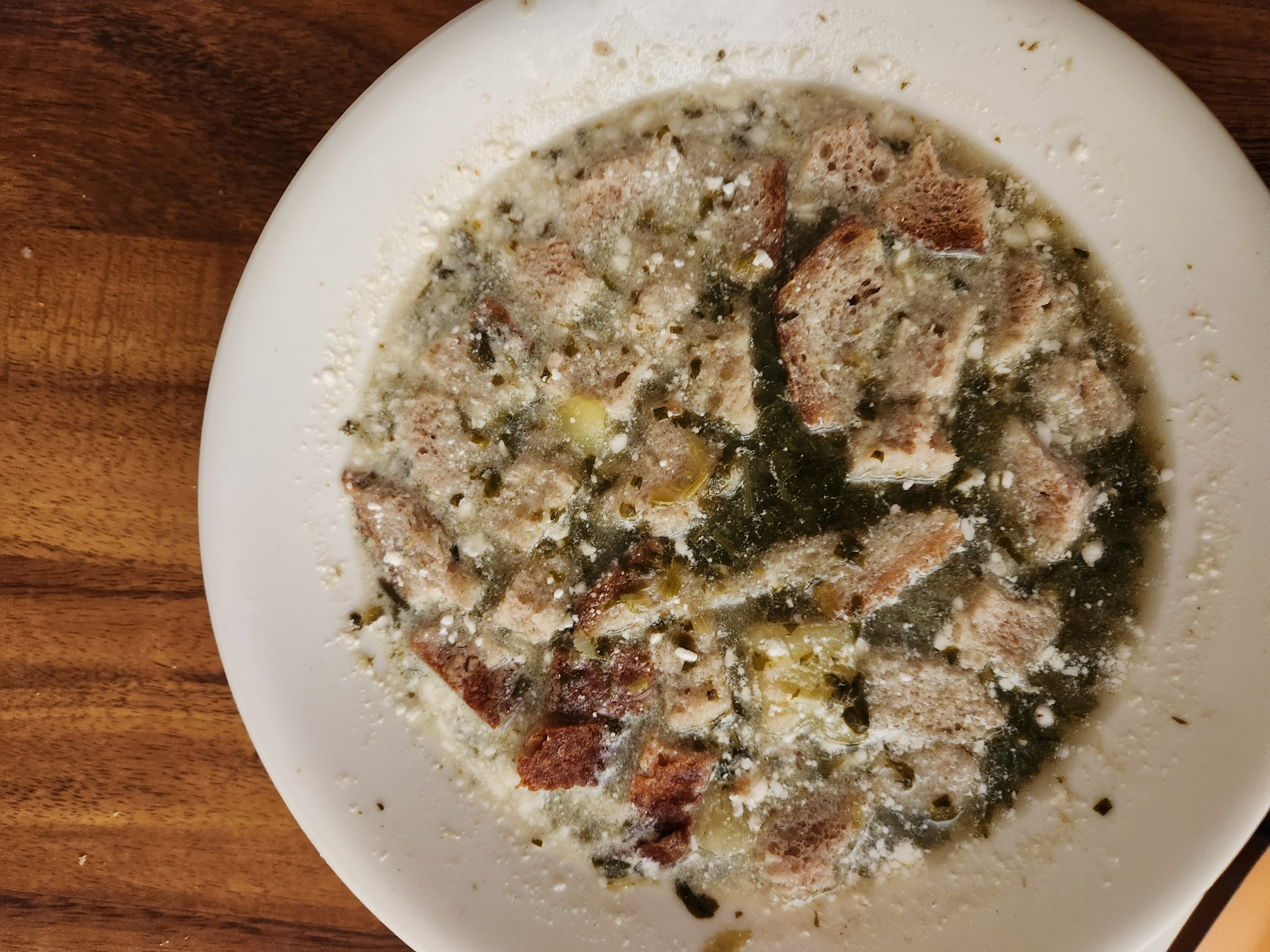
- Tyrya based on sorrel stew, soured milk added
- Type: Soup
- Place of origin: Russia
- Serving temperature: Cold
- Main ingredients: Stale bread or biscuits, vegetables, liquid (traditionally kvass)
- Variations: Okroshka

Tyurya, sometimes known as murtsovka, is a traditional bread soup in Russian cuisine, sometimes considered a variant of okroshka. It consists of chunks of bread, often stale or semi-stale, or dried/baked into sukhari biscuits/hardtack, soaked in a flavorful liquid or, alternatively, plain water, with some vegetables (chiefly onion, garlic or sauerkraut) and vegetable oil added and flavored with salt and pepper. The base liquid could be anything that can be consumed cold, because unlike most other bread soups, tyurya was prepared and consumed without heat. Kvass was historically the most popular base for tyurya, due to it being cheap, plentiful and flavorful enough. A dairy base, like plain or sour milk, whey or kefir was considered fancy and was generally prepared for children, the elderly or the infirm. It is, along with pokhlyobka, a traditional Lenten soup.

Made with black bread, it was a staple food of the Russian Red Army during World War II.

== Synonyms and etymology ==
The dish has many synonyms, both general Russian and local: tyura, turka, tubka, tyupka, murtsovka, mura, ruli, kawardachok.

In case the bread is added in the form of rusks (rus.sukhari), it is often called sukharnitsa.

In the Tula province, a tyurya made of bread, onions, kvass and vegetable oil was called uvanchiki.

The Russian name "tyurya" occurred from Türkic * tӱ̄r (from tyur, tyir) "crumb": "a meal of crushed bread with water". From the Russian language, the word "tyurya" has penetrated into the Latvian (Latvian: čuruls – food from water, bread and onions) and Belarusian (Belarusian: цура́, цю́ра, along with other synonyms – мурцоўка, рулі, мочёнки, мочёунки).

"Murtsovka" comes from the French morceaux: "pieces".

"Mura" – from the Finnish muru: "crumb".

== History and preparation ==
In the most popular and probably original variant, tyurya was the cheap, cooling and filling meal for a peasant in the field. Several slices of day-old rye bread, diced onion and some fresh herbs were combined in a bowl and soaked with a liberal amount of kvass, then flavored with salt and optionally pepper. Some vegetable oil was often added, historically linseed, mustard or cheaper olive oil, as sunflowers only become popular in Russia in the late nineteenth century. When a family could spare some dairy, or when someone was ill, the festive, dessert tyurya, considered more palatable and easily digestible, was prepared, which was sweetened with honey or, later, white sugar.
