= Bulgarian cuisine =

Culinary traditions of Bulgaria

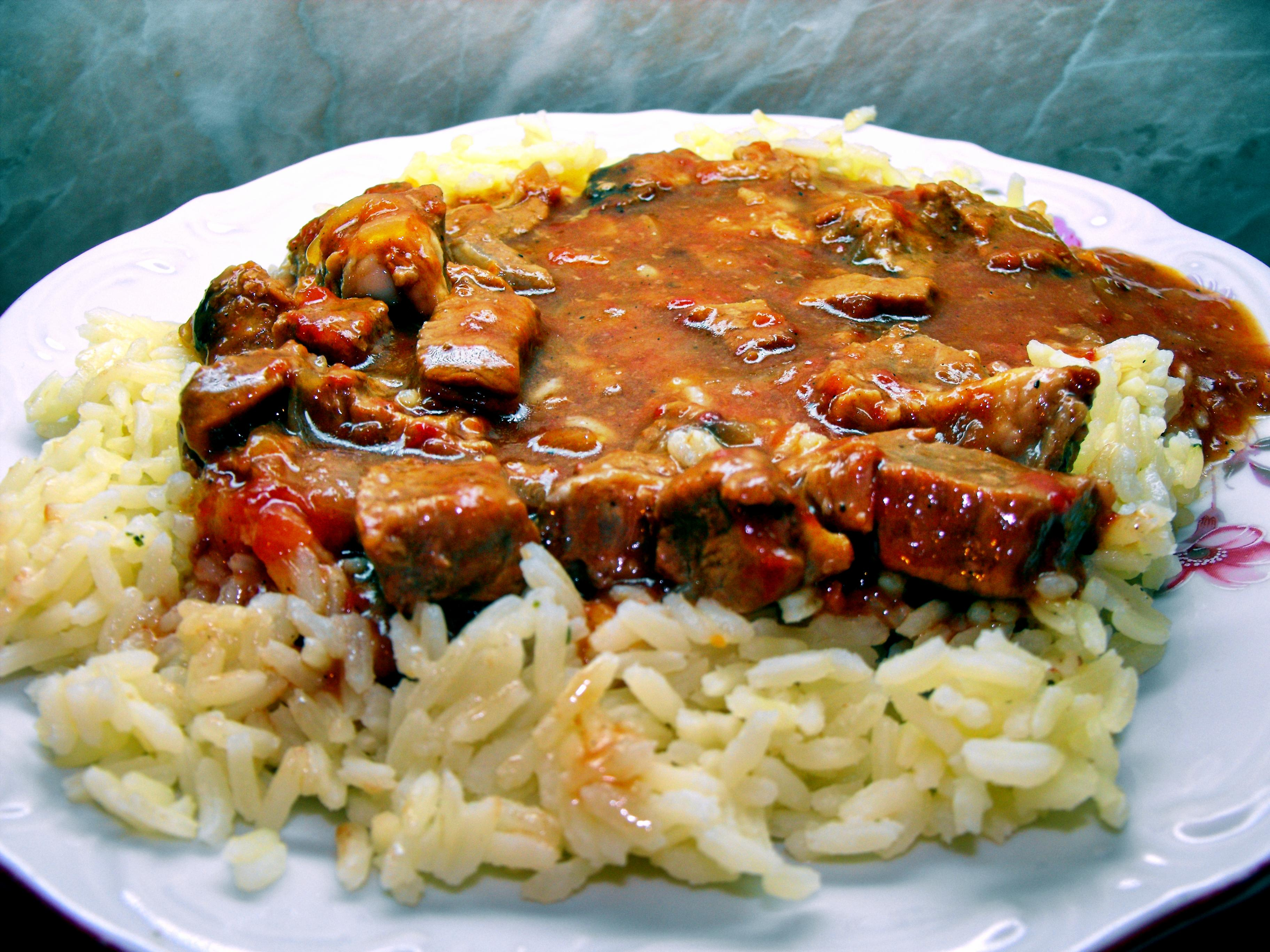
Bulgarian kebab with rice

Bulgarian cuisine is part of the cuisine of Eastern Europe, sharing characteristics with other Balkan cuisines. Bulgarian cooking traditions are diverse because of geographical factors such as climatic conditions suitable for a variety of vegetables, herbs, and fruit. Aside from the variety of local Bulgarian dishes, Bulgarian cuisine shares a number of dishes with its neighboring countries, in particular with Turkish and Greek cuisine.

Bulgarian cuisine includes a significant contribution from Ottoman cuisine, and therefore shares a number of dishes with Middle Eastern cuisine, including moussaka, gyuvetch, kyufte, baklava, ayran, and shish kebab. Bulgarian food often incorporates salads as appetizers and is also noted for the prominence of dairy products, wines, and other alcoholic drinks such as rakia. The cuisine also features a variety of soups, such as the cold soup tarator, and pastries, such as the filo dough-based banitsa, pita, and the various types of börek.

Main courses are very typically water-based stews, either vegetarian or with lamb, goat meat, veal, chicken, or pork. Deep-frying is not common, but grilling—especially of different kinds of sausages—is prominent. Pork is common, often mixed with veal or lamb, although fish and chicken are also widely used. While most cattle are bred for milk production rather than meat, veal is popular for grilling meat appetizers (meze) and in some main courses. As a substantial exporter of lamb, Bulgaria's own consumption is notable, especially in the spring.

Similar to other Balkan cultures, the per-capita consumption of yogurt (Bulgarian: кисело мляко, romanized: kiselo mlyako, lit. 'sour milk') among Bulgarians is traditionally higher than the rest of Europe. The country is notable as the historical namesake for Lactobacillus bulgaricus, a microorganism chiefly responsible for the local variety of dairy products. Sirene (сирене), a white brine cheese similar to feta, is also a popular ingredient used in salads and a variety of pastries.

Holidays are often observed in conjunction with certain meals. On Christmas Eve, for instance, tradition requires vegetarian stuffed peppers and cabbage leaves sarmi. New Year's Eve usually involves cabbage dishes, Nikulden (Day of St. Nicholas, December 6) involves fish (usually carp), while Gergyovden (Day of St. George, May 6) is typically celebrated with roast lamb.

== Traditional Bulgarian foods ==
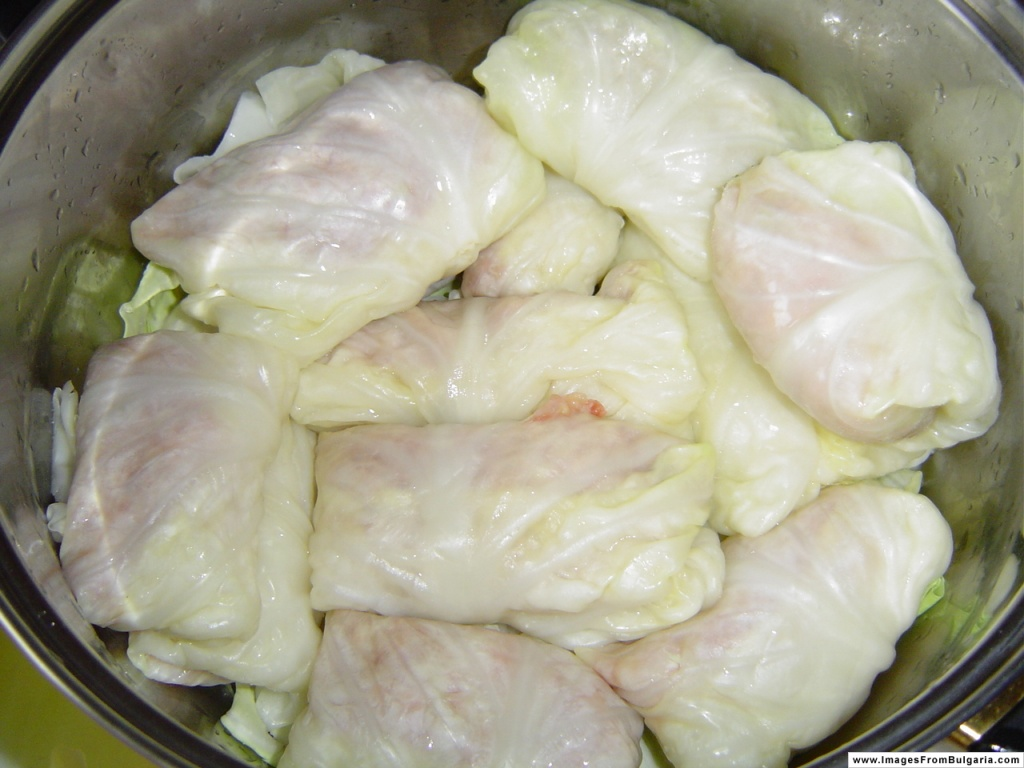
Sarmi, a traditional Bulgarian Christmas Eve dish

=== Bulgarian breakfast ===
- Banitsa – baked pastry made of layered stuffing and phyllo. There are many varieties with different names, with arguably the most famous one being with eggs, sirene, and yogurt.
- Börek – a filled pastry made with layers of filo dough.
- Tutmanik – similar to pita, made with yeast dough and milk, but with white cheese.
- Milinki (singular: milinka) – bread-roll-type pastry with eggs and sirene
- Princesi ("princesses"), open-faced baked sandwich with either minced meat; yellow cheese; eggs and sirene cheese.
- Mekitsi (singular: mekitsa) – deep-fried dough pastry, typically served with jam, honey, sirene, or icing sugar
- French toast (purjena filia) – bread dipped in eggs and milk (either cow's milk or yogurt) and fried in oil
- Kazanlak doughnuts – a specific type of doughnuts, from the town of Kazanlak
- Buhti (singular: buhta) – deep-fried dough balls, often served with jam, honey, or sirene
- Langidi (singular: langida) – somewhat similar to American-style pancakes, soft and eggy
- Palachinki (singular: palachinka) – pancakes that are thinner than American pancakes and usually rolled around stuffing
- Katmi (singular: katma) – bigger and thicker pancakes, rolled around stuffing
- Popara – might be made from rusks, bread, or kozunak with tea, milk, or sour milk (Bulgarian yogurt).

=== Cold cuts ===
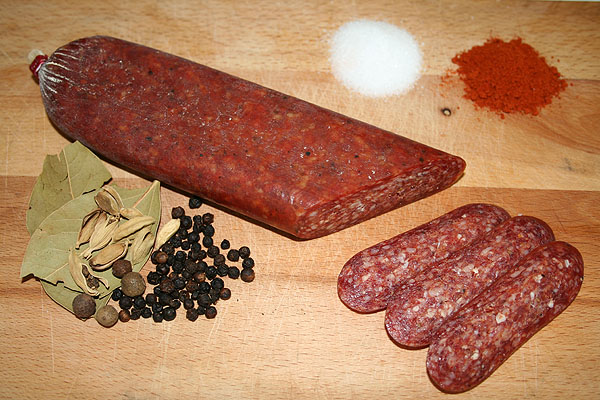
Lukanka, a traditional Bulgarian cold cut

- Banski starets (also banski staretz) – spicy sausage, native to the Bansko region
- Elenski but – air-cured ham sausage, seasoned with herbs
- Lukanka – spicy salami of minced beef and pork
- Pastarma – spicy beef sausage; a variant of Anatolian dried meat called pastirma.
- Sujuk (also soudjouk, sukuk, sukuk, or sucuk) – flat cured, dark red sausage, common in the Balkans, Eastern Mediterranean, and North Africa

=== Soups and stews ===
- Tarator – cold soup of cucumbers, garlic, yogurt, and dill
- Vegetable soup – with various fresh vegetables and potatoes
- Nettle soup – with rice and sirene
- Spinach soup – with sirene and eggs
- Bob chorba – hot bean soup
- Lentil soup – soup made with brown lentils
- Mushroom soup – with forest mushrooms
- Chicken soup – made with vermicelli, potatoes, and vegetables
- Teleshko vareno – boiled veal, potatoes, and vegetables in consommé
- Fisherman's soup (Ribena chorba) – a traditional spicy fish soup, made with thyme and fresh lovage
- Topcheta soup – meatball soup thickened with egg yolks and yogurt
- Kurban chorba – lamb meat and lamb organ meats, eggs, and vegetables
- Shkembe chorba – spicy soup made of tripe, reputed in Bulgaria to be a "hangover cure"
- Pacha – a sour pork's-trotter soup, with sour ingredients such as pickles, bitter fruit, or vinegar in the broth
- Gyuvetch – spicy vegetable stew with vegetables and sometimes different meats, often cooked in a clay pot
- Smilyanski fasul – Smilyan bean stew
- Potato stew
Bulgarian soups
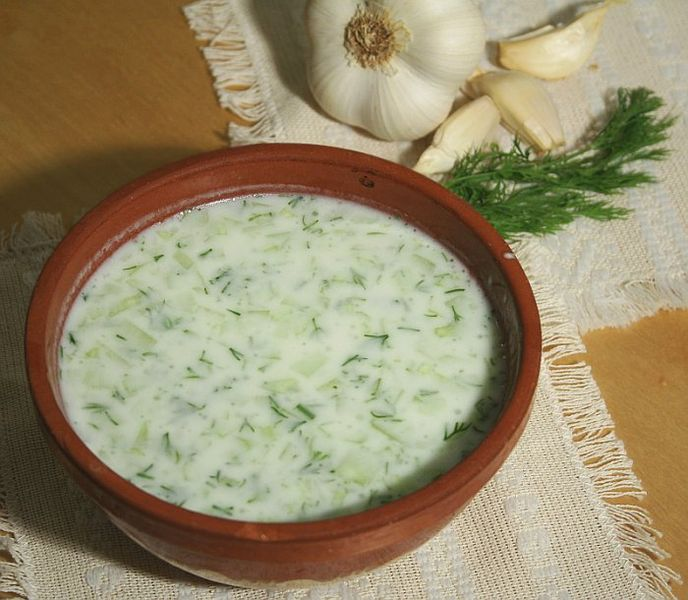
Tarator is a cold soup made of yogurt, minced cucumber, dill, garlic, and sunflower or olive oil.

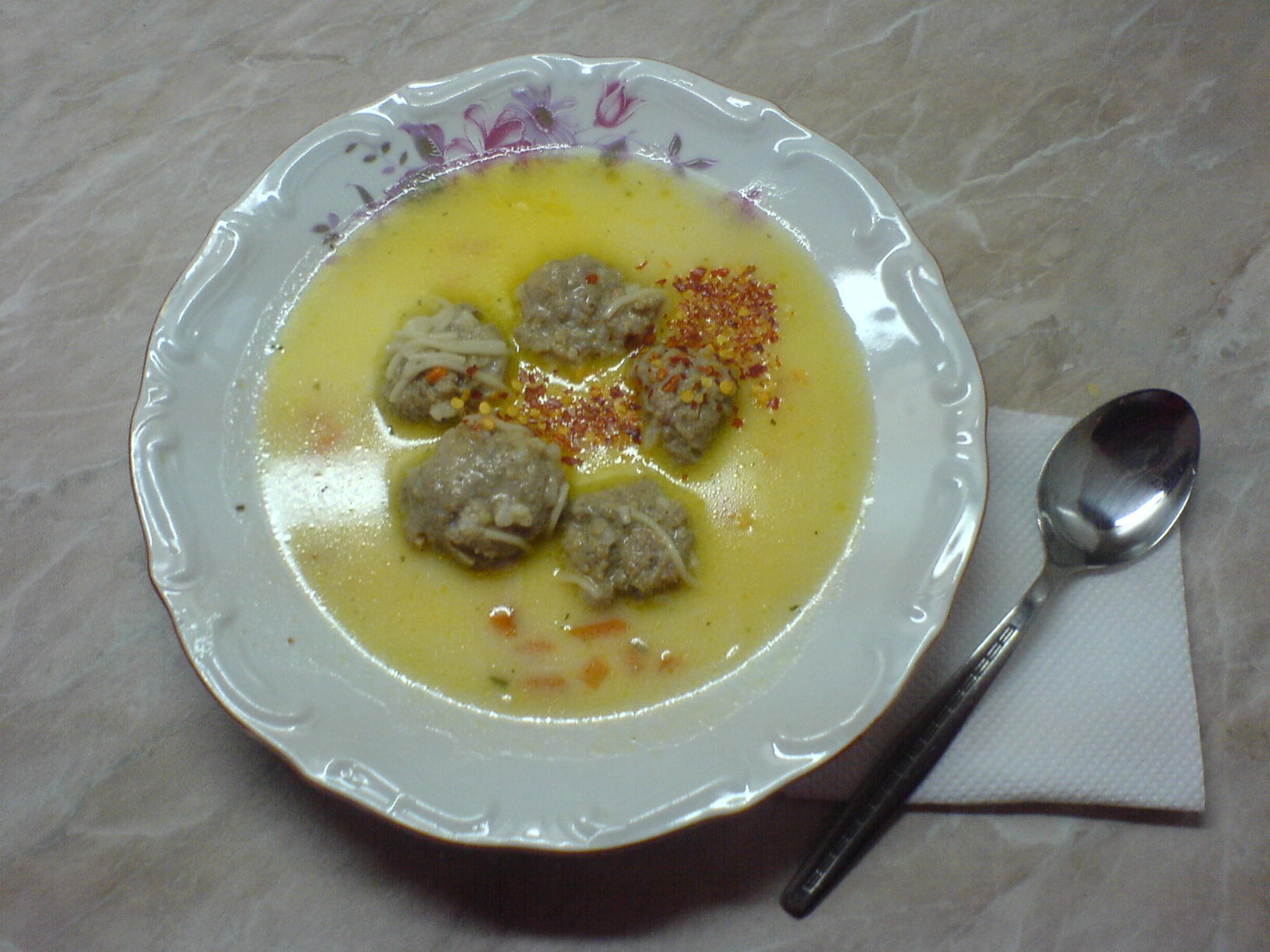
Topcheta soup

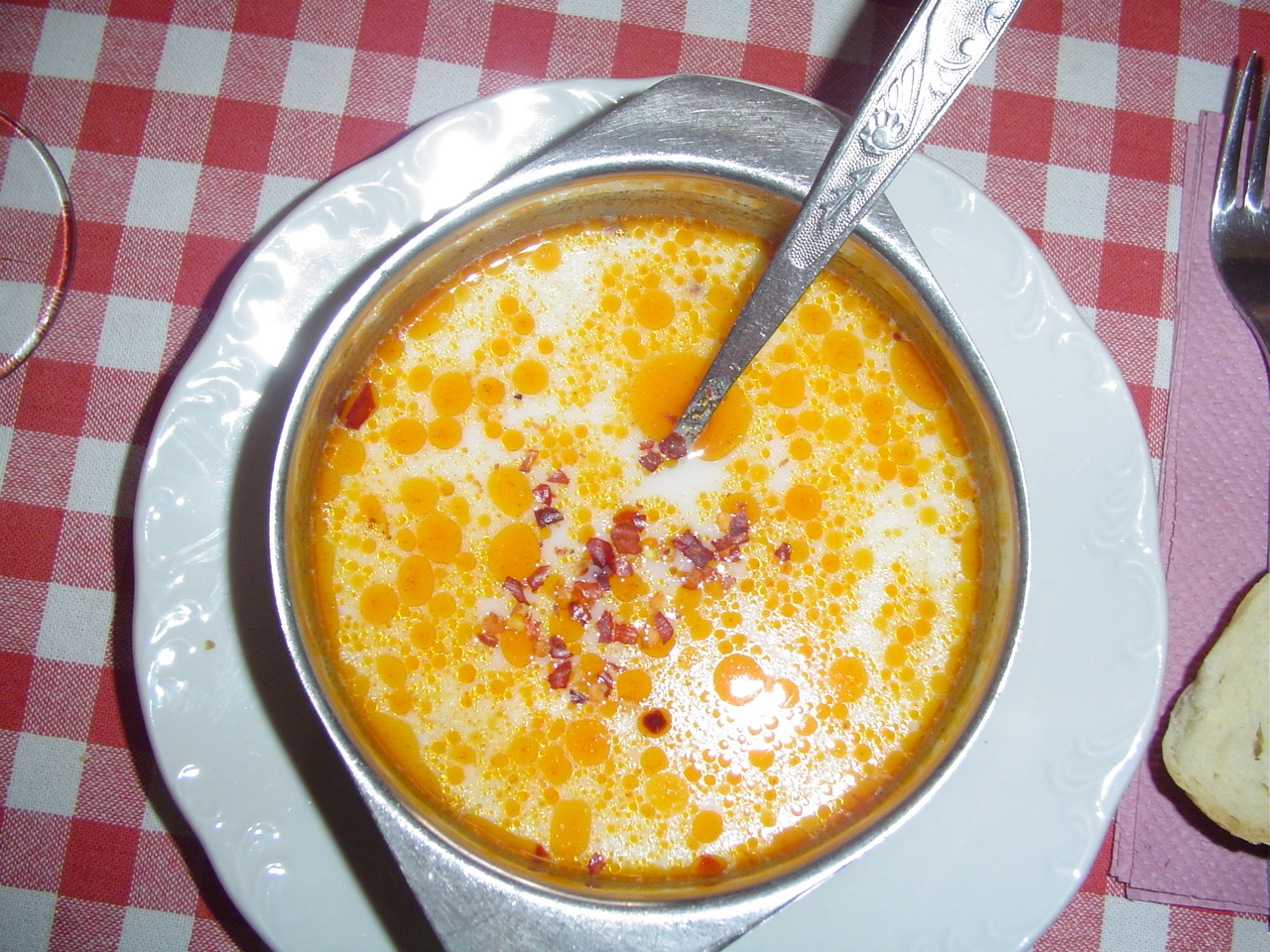
Shkembe chorba

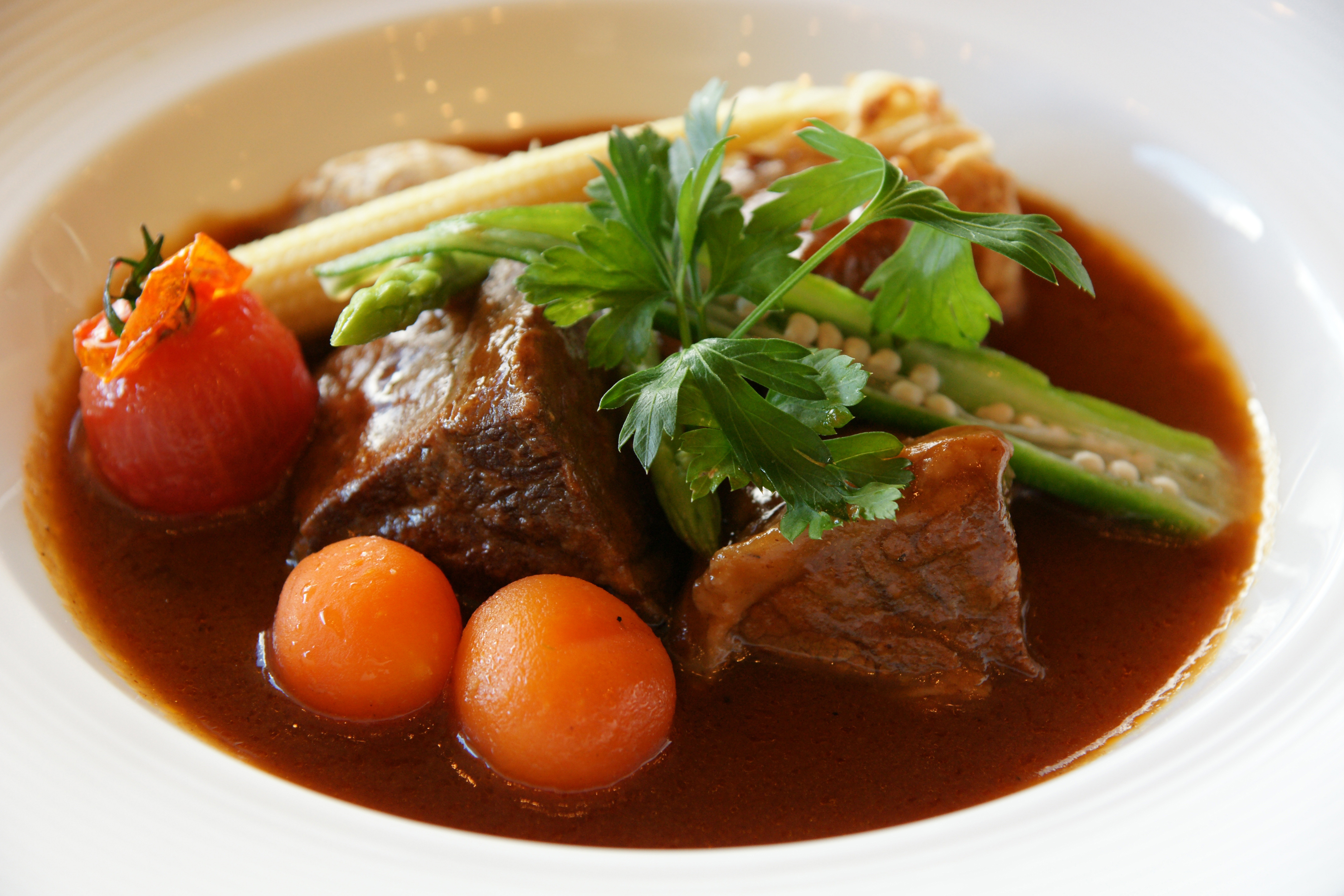
Teleshko vareno, a traditional Bulgarian soup

=== Salads ===
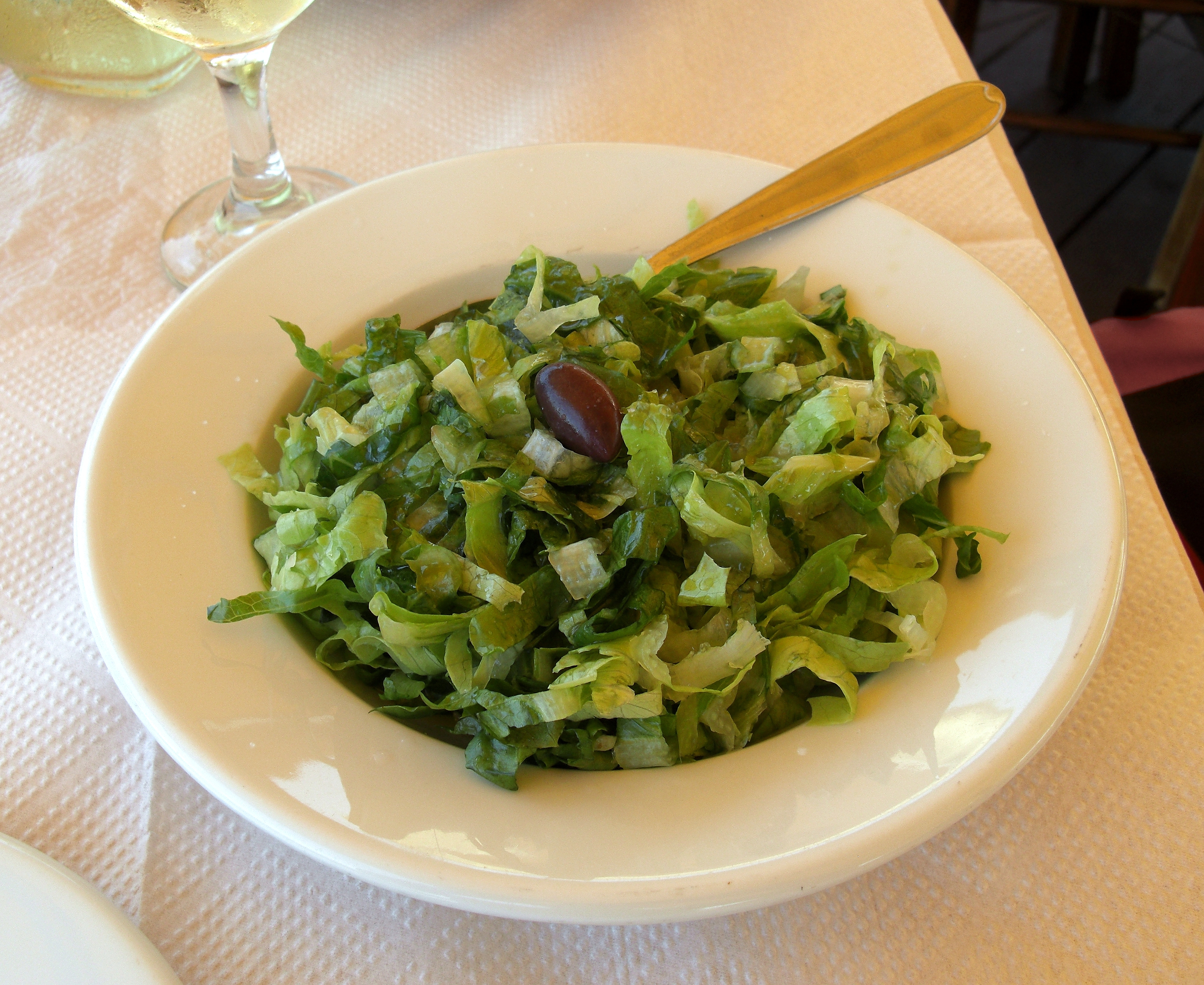
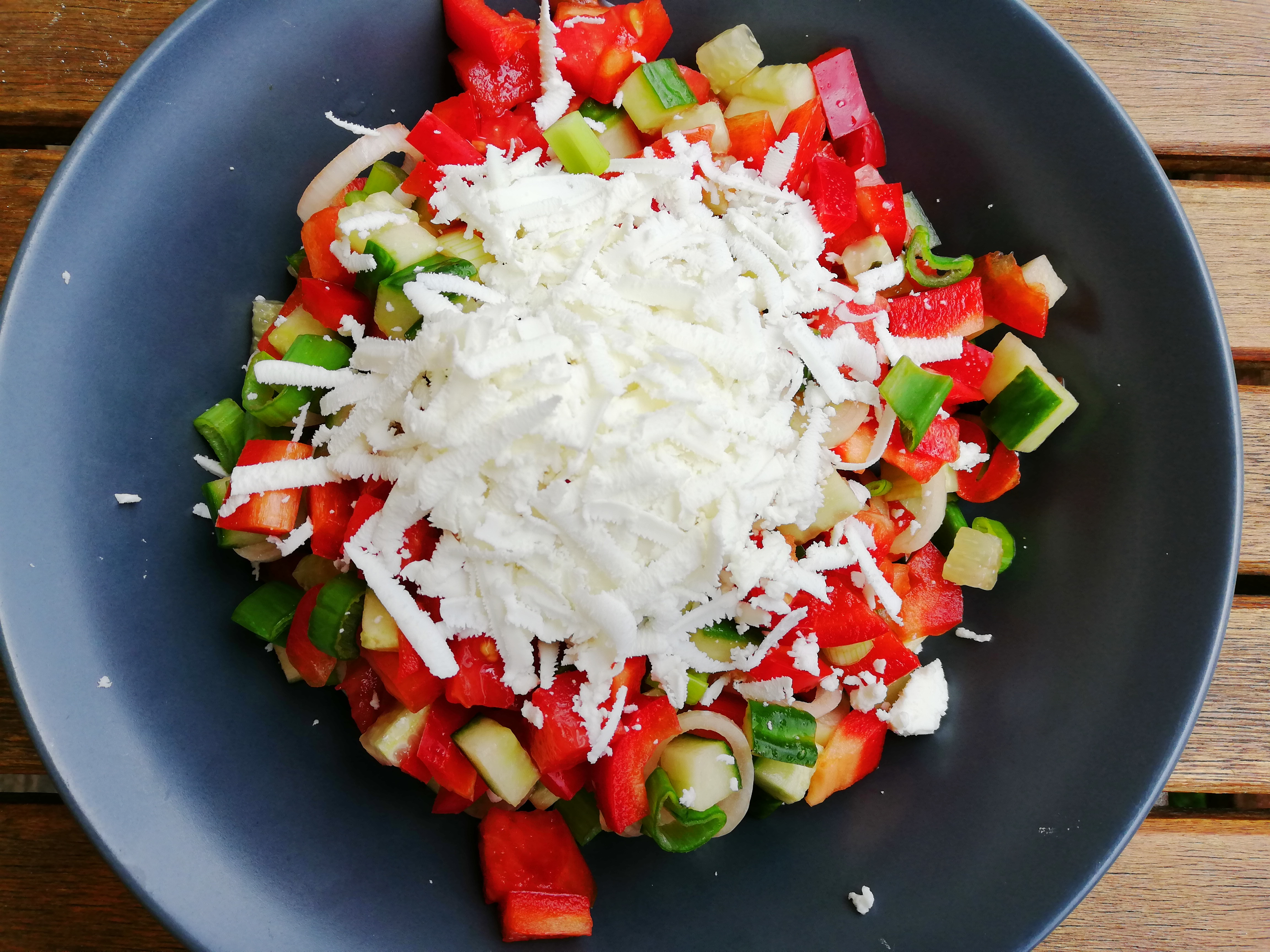
Green salad (left) and shopska salad (right)
- Ovcharska salata (shepherd's salad) – shopska salad, with the addition of grated egg, mushrooms, and sometimes ham
- Ruska salata (Russian salad) – salad with potatoes, carrots, gherkins, ham and mayonnaise
- Shopska salad – a common salad of chopped cucumbers, onions, peppers, and tomatoes with white cheese
- Snezhanka ("Snow White salad") – chopped cucumbers with yogurt, dill, garlic, and often walnuts
- Turshiya (also torsi) – pickled vegetables, such as celery, beets, cauliflower, and cabbage, popular in wintertime; variations are selska turshiya (country pickle) and tsarska turshiya (king's pickles)

=== Sauces, relishes, and appetizers ===
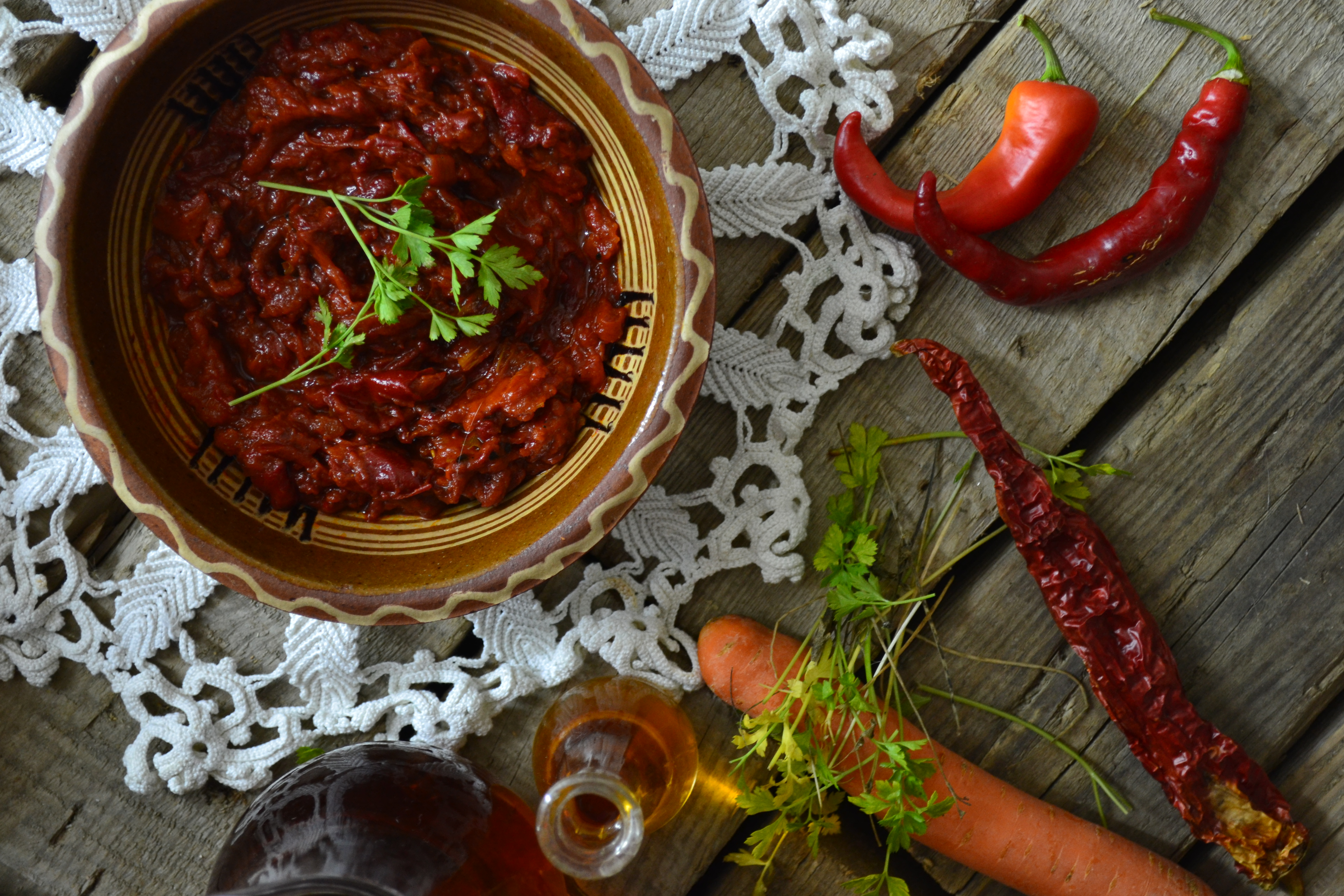
Lyutenica is a traditional Bulgarian sauce made from tomatoes and peppers

- Lyutenitsa (also lyutenitza) – purée of tomatoes, red peppers, and carrots, often served on bread and topped with white cheese
- Kyopulu (also kyopolou) – roasted eggplant (aubergine) and bell peppers, mashed with parsley, garlic, and other ingredients
- Lyutika – spicy sauce
- Podluchen sauce or yogurt sauce – yogurt with garlic, oil, paprika, salt, and sometimes dill
- Katino meze – hot starter with chopped pork meat, onion, and mushrooms with fresh butter and spices
- Drob po selski – chopped liver with onion and peppers
- Ezik v maslo – sliced tongue in butter
- Sirene pane – breaded Bulgarian brine white cheese bites
- Kashkaval pane – breaded kashkaval bites
- Mussels in butter – with onion and fresh herbs; traditionally from Sozopol

=== Skara (grill) ===
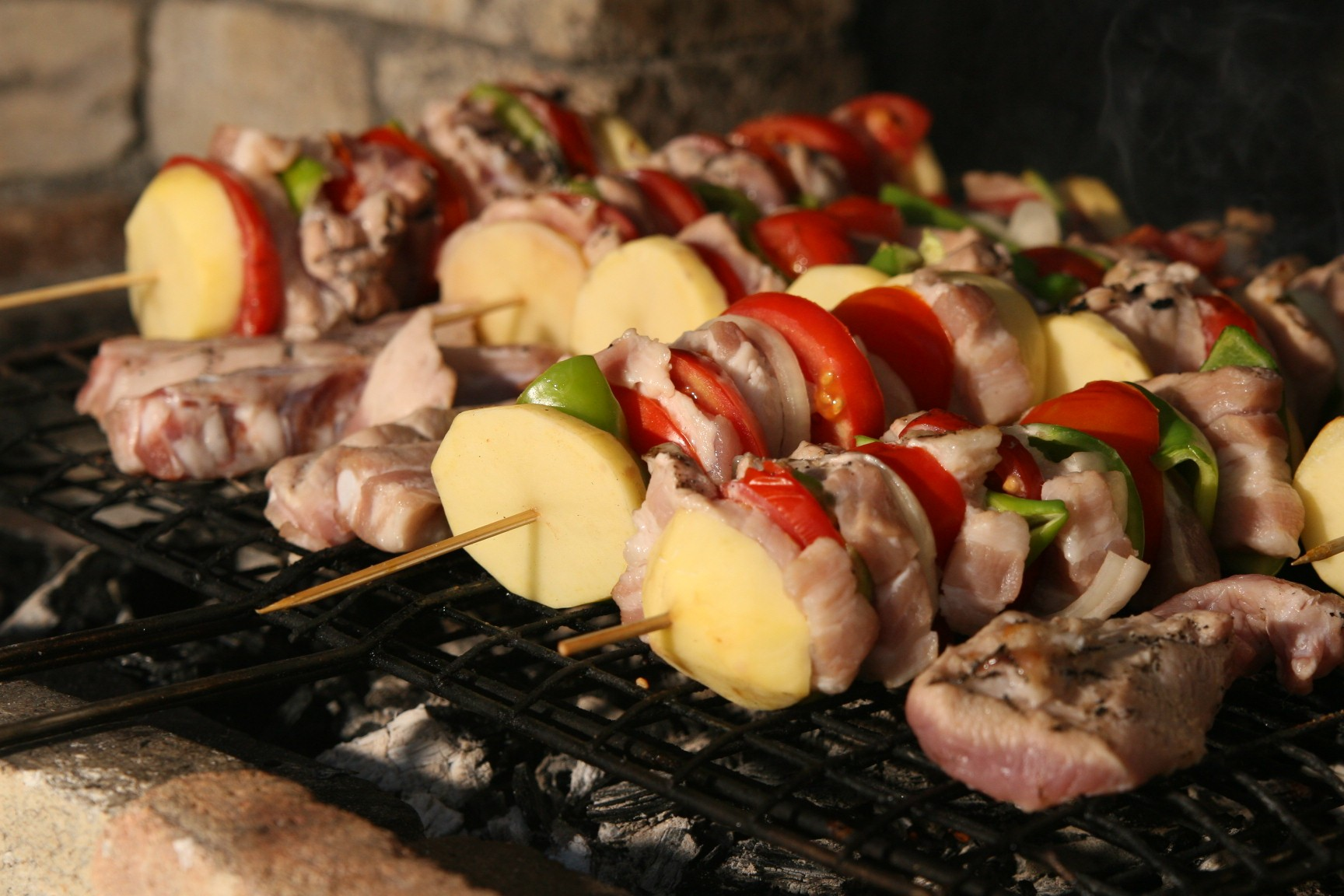
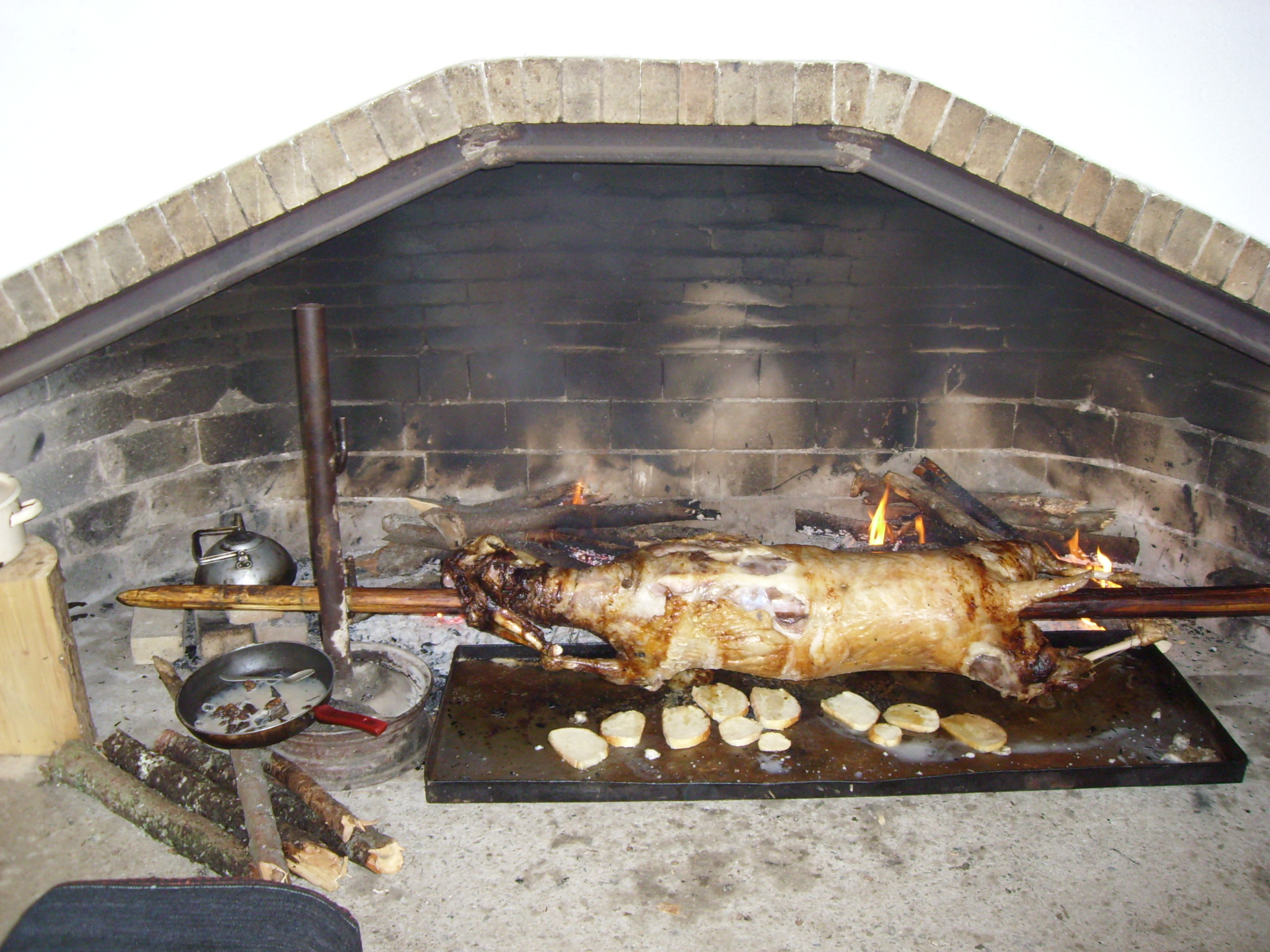
Shishcheta (left) and Cheverme grill from the Rhodopes (right)
- Kyufte – meatballs of minced pork meat, seasoned with traditional spices and shaped in a flattened ball
- Kebapche – similar to meatballs, but seasoned with cumin and shaped in a stick
- Parjola – pork steak, chop, or flank
- Shishcheta – marinated pieces of chicken or pork and vegetables
- Karnache – a type of sausage with special spices
- Nadenitsa – a type of sausage with special spices
- Tatarsko kyufte – stuffed meatballs
- Nevrozno kyufte – very piquant meatballs
- Chicken in caul
- Cheverme – used in celebrations such as weddings, graduations, and birthdays; a whole animal, traditionally a pig, but also chicken or a lamb, is slowly cooked in an open fire, rotated manually on a wooden skewer from 4 to 7 hours
- Meshana skara (mixed grill plate) – consists of kebapche, kyufte, shishche, and karnache or nadenitsa
- Grilled vegetables – usually a garnish or a side dish
- Grilled fish (saltwater or freshwater)

=== Main dishes ===
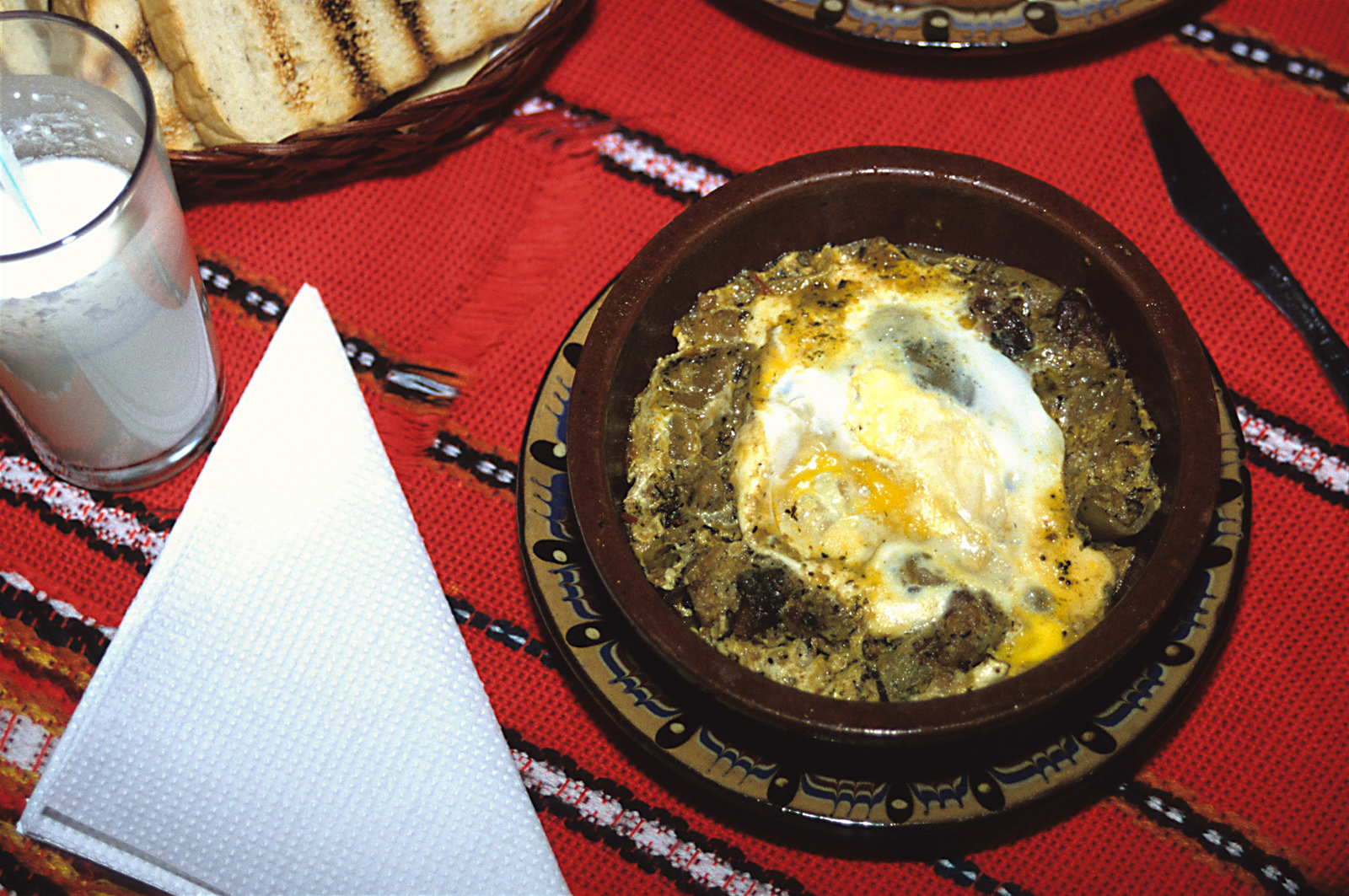
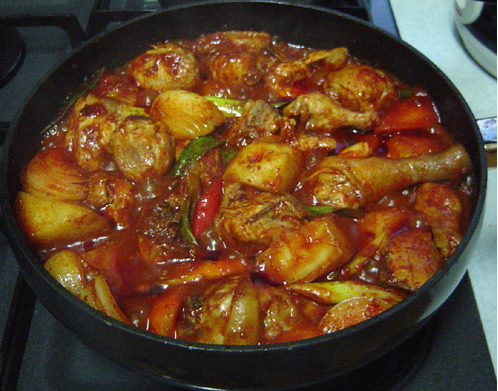
Bulgarian kavarma (left) and yahniya (right)

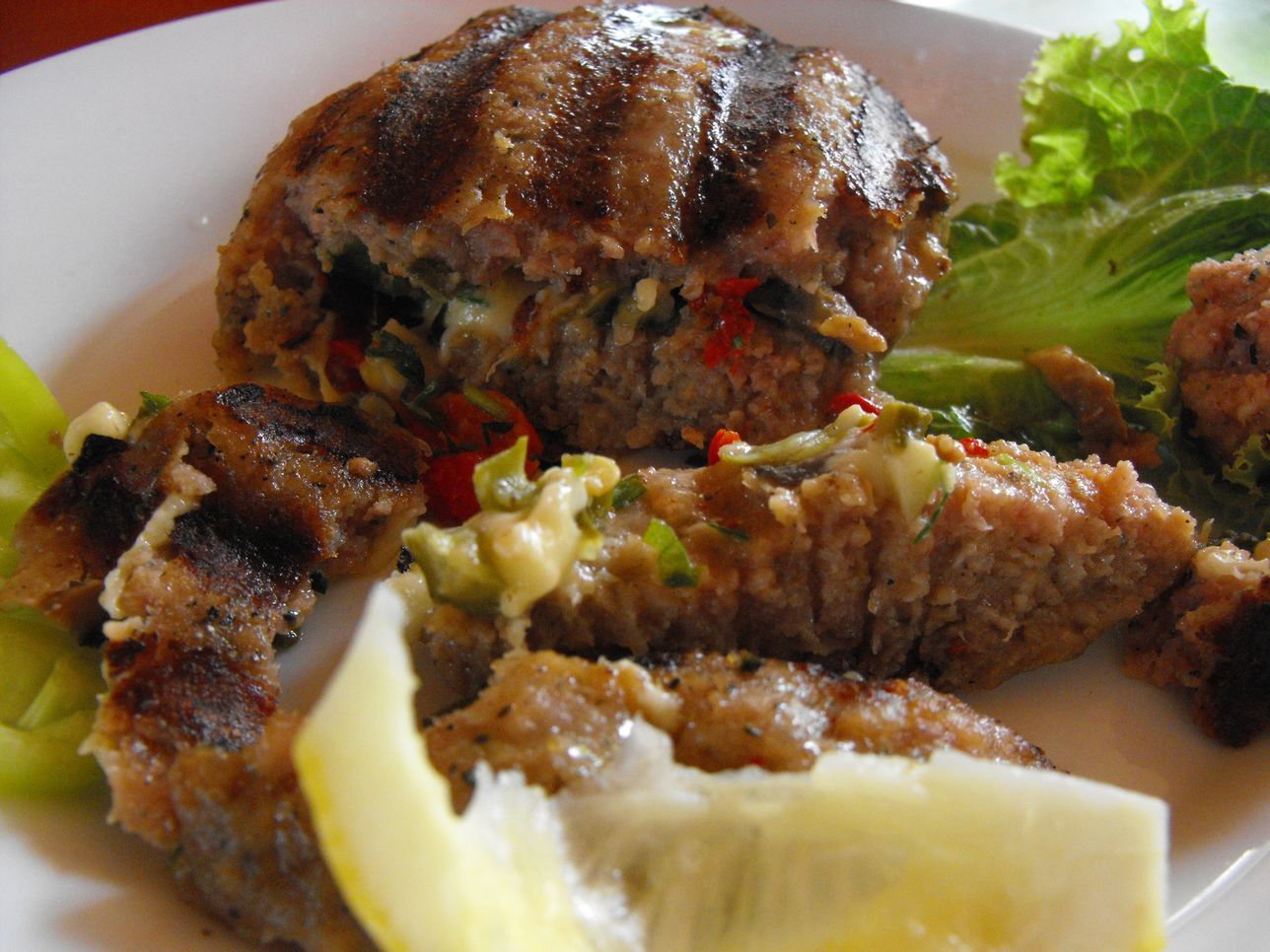
Tatarsko kufte, a stuffed meatball, prepared by grilling (skara)

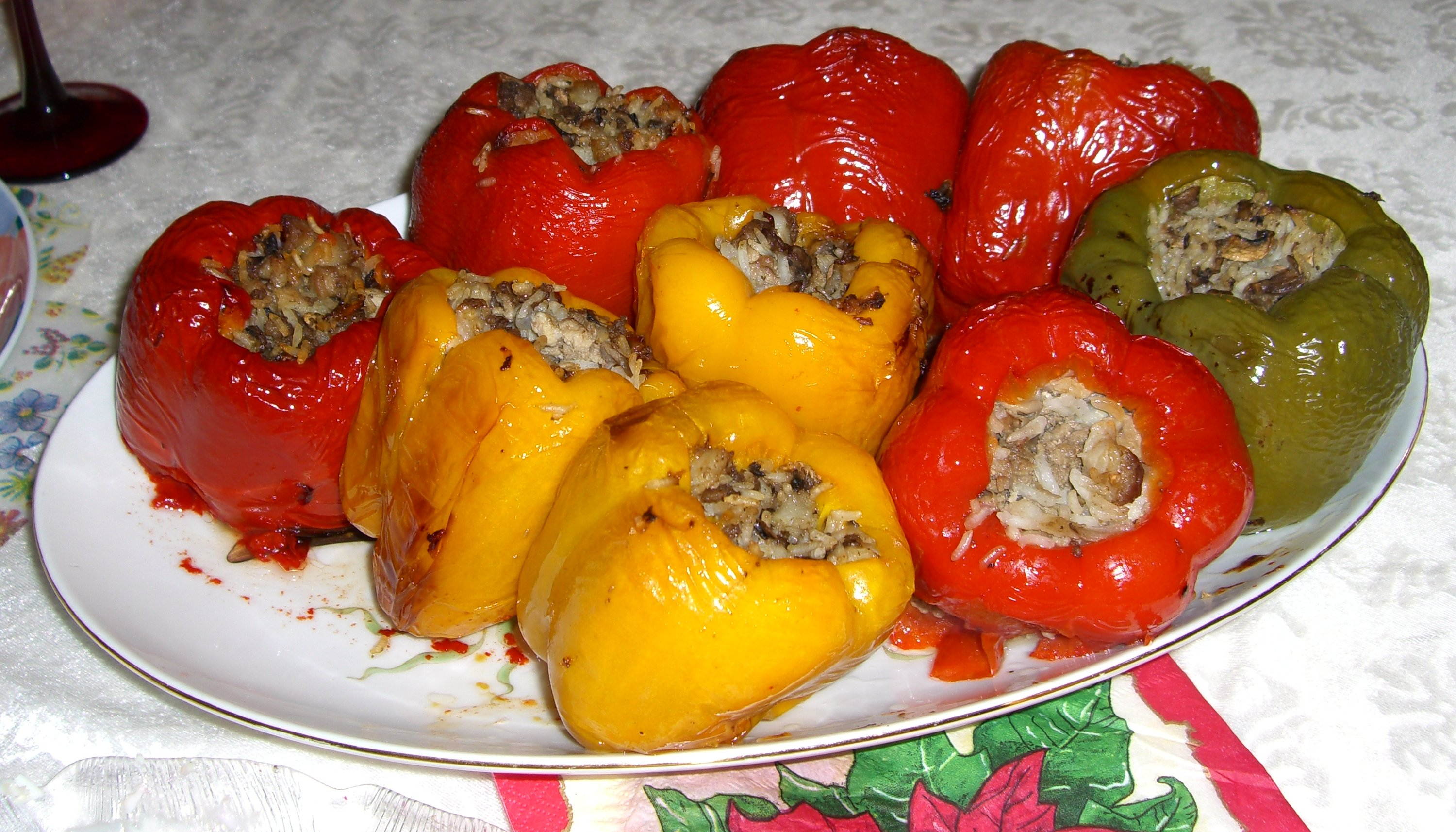
Stuffed peppers

Whole pigs, roasted on charcoal in Pernik

- Ghivetch – vegetable stew.
- Yahniya – vegetable and meat stew.
- Plakiya
- Stuffed cabbage (Sarma) – Cabbages stuffed with rice and minced meat.
- Stuffed zucchini
- Pulneni chushki – Bulgarian stuffed bell peppers
- Drob Sarma – lamb or calf's liver and rice.
- Wine, Tepsi, or Tas kebab
- Kavarma
- Kapama
- Mish-mash – popular summer dish made with tomatoes, peppers, onion, white brine cheese, eggs, and fresh spices
- Pilaf – rice with chopped meat, vegetables, or mussels
- Moussaka
- Chomlek
- Mlin
- Peppers börek
- Roasted beans
- Beans with sausage
- Pork with rice
- Roasted chicken with potatoes
- Pork with cabbage
- Chicken with cabbage
- Roasted potatoes
- Drusan kebab
- Chicken with rice
- Tatarian meatball
- Meatball(s) with white sauce stew
- Kjufteta po Chirpanski – meatballs with potatoes; a recipe from Chirpan
- Meatloaf 'Rulo "Stephanie"'
- Potato balls with sauce
- Panagyurishte-style eggs
- Fried courgettes with yogurt sauce
- Chicken in katmi – popular in a "Thracian" variety
- Fish Zelnik – with sauerkraut and rice
- Fish in pastry – usually in celebration of St. Nicholas
- Stuffed carp or Nikuldenski carp – prepared for the feast of St. Nicholas
- Chushki burek is a popular dish made of stuffed red peppers with filling Bulgarian cheese, eggs and herbs and fried.

=== Breads and pastries ===
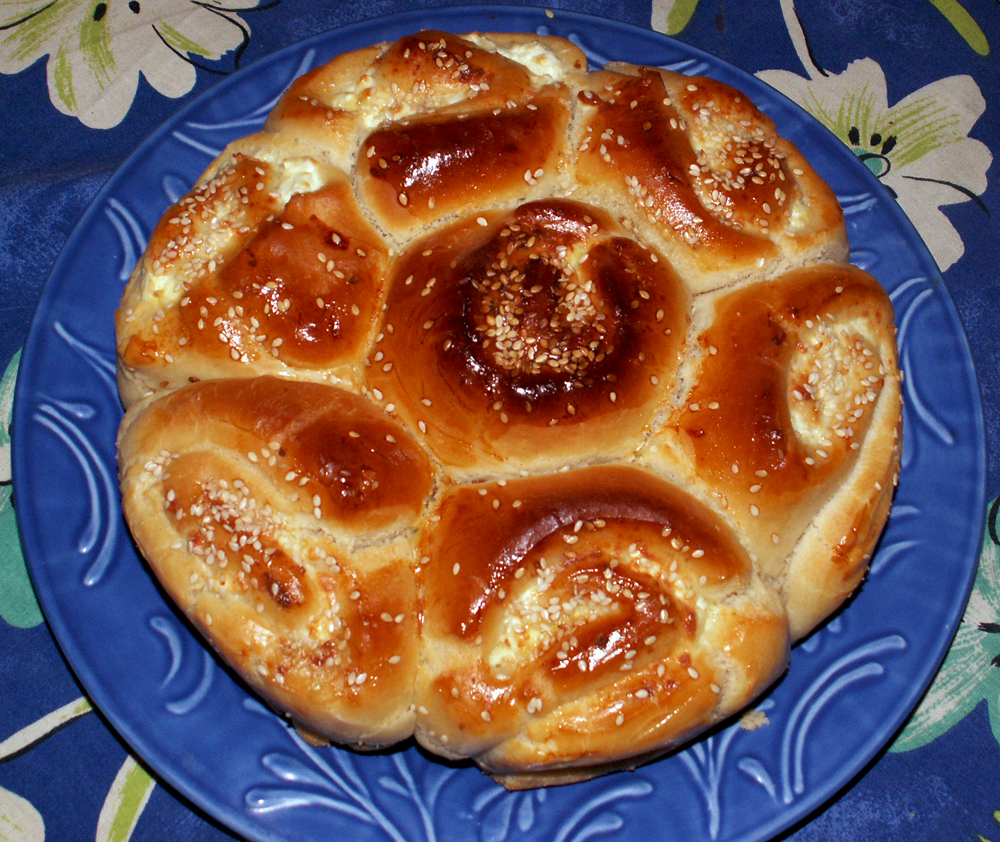
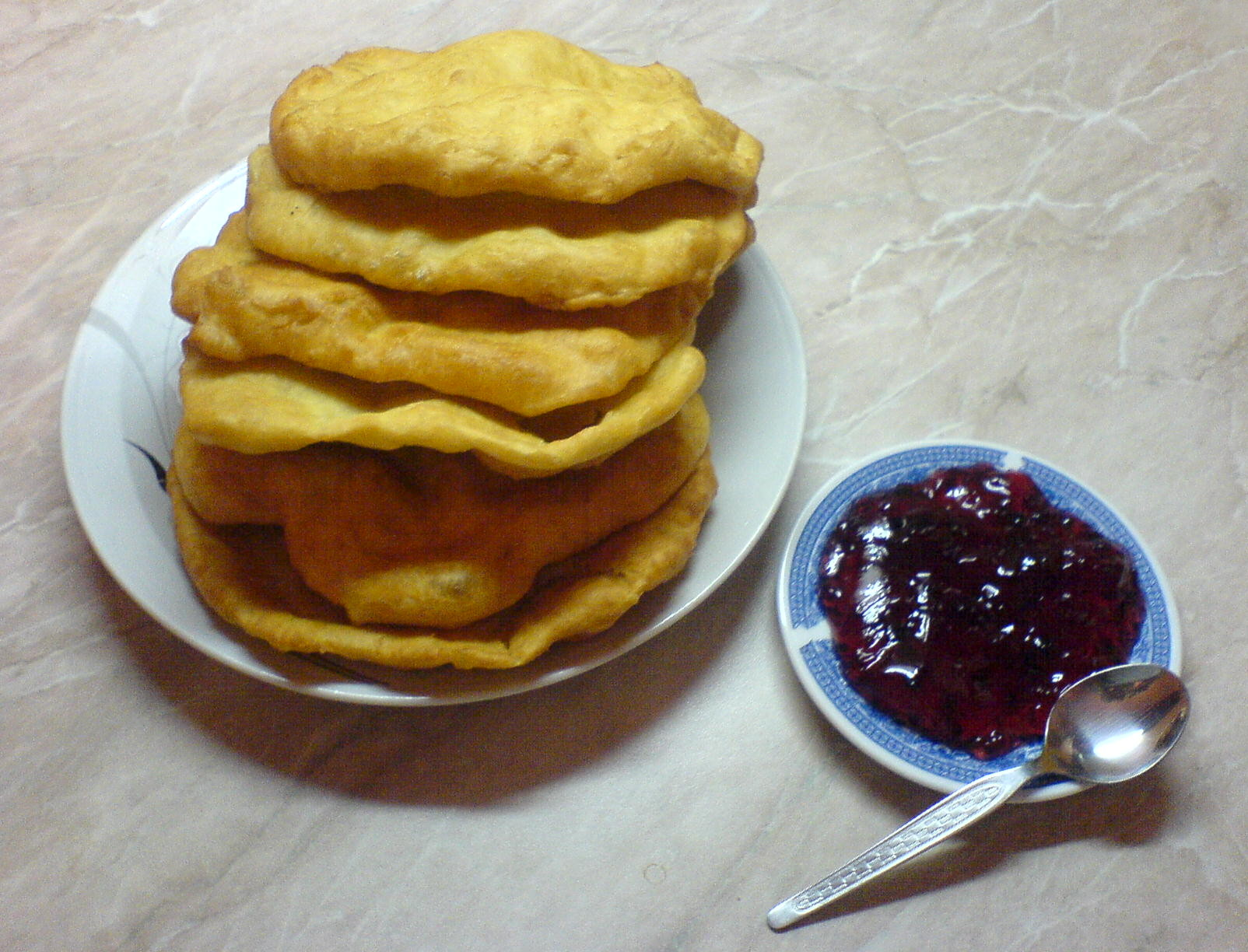
Traditional Bulgarian pogača (left) and a pile of mekitsi with jam (right)
- Pita
- Sweet pita
- Pita with meat – variably with mushrooms or with tomatoes and onion
- Pogača (usual ritual bread)
- Kravai (usual ritual bread)
- Kolach (usual ritual bread)
- Banitsa – the most popular pastry in Bulgaria with a number of varieties
- Tikvenik – banitsa with pumpkins
- Zelnik – banitsa with white brine cheese and cabbage, spinach, leek, scallion, parsley, or sorrel
- Baklava – sweet pastry.
- Saraliya
- Parlenki
- Patatnik
- Kačamak
- Byal Mazh
- Tutmanik
- Milinka
- Gevrek
- Kozunak
- Mekitsi – deep fried kneaded dough made with yogurt and eggs
- Marudnitsi
- Katmi – a variety of pancakes
- Palachinki – a variety of crêpes
- Langidi
- Tiganitsi (similar to Mekitsi)
- Dudnik
- Popara
- Sulovar
- Parjeni filii – "fried toasts"
- Kiflichki with jam or white cheese
- Solenki
- Yufka
- Trienitsa or skrob
- Tarhana

=== Dairy products ===
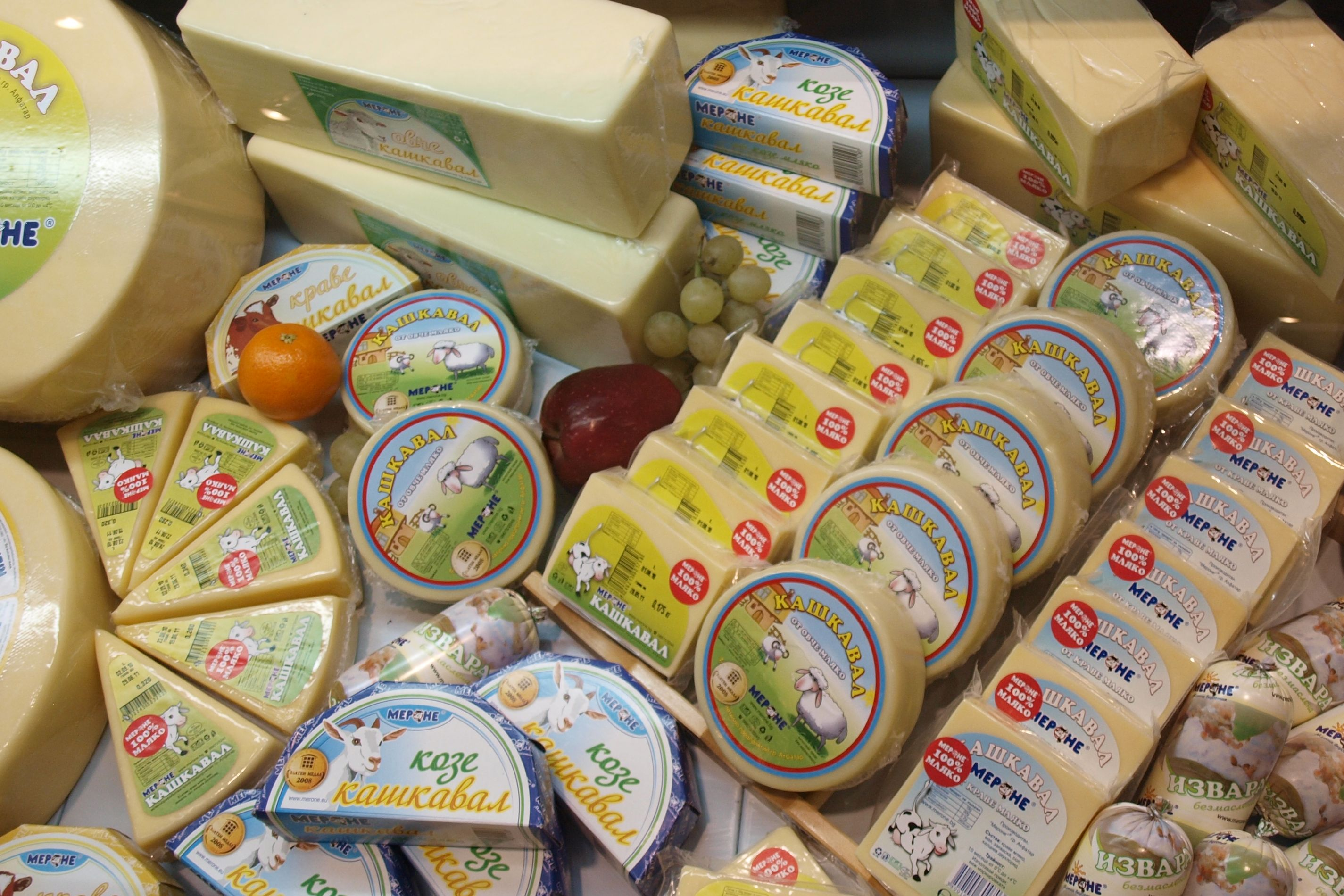
Vacuum-packed kashkaval cheese in Bulgarian store

Bulgaria has a strong tradition of using milk and dairy products. Bulgaria even has a namesake strain of bacteria, Lactobacillus bulgaricus, used to make many of its cheeses and fermented foods which gives it a distinct flavor.

- Sirene – soft and salty white brine cheese that appears in many Bulgarian dishes
- Kashkaval – hard yellow cheese, often used in appetizers; kashkaval Vitosha is made from cow's milk, while kashkaval Balkan is made from ewe's milk
- Kiselo mlyako (lit. 'sour milk') – Bulgarian yogurt, produced using Lactobacillus delbrueckii subsp. bulgaricus; used in many Bulgarian dishes
- Smetana – sour cream
- Izvara – cottage cheese, quark
- Katak – a traditional fermented curd/yogurt-like product

=== Sweets ===
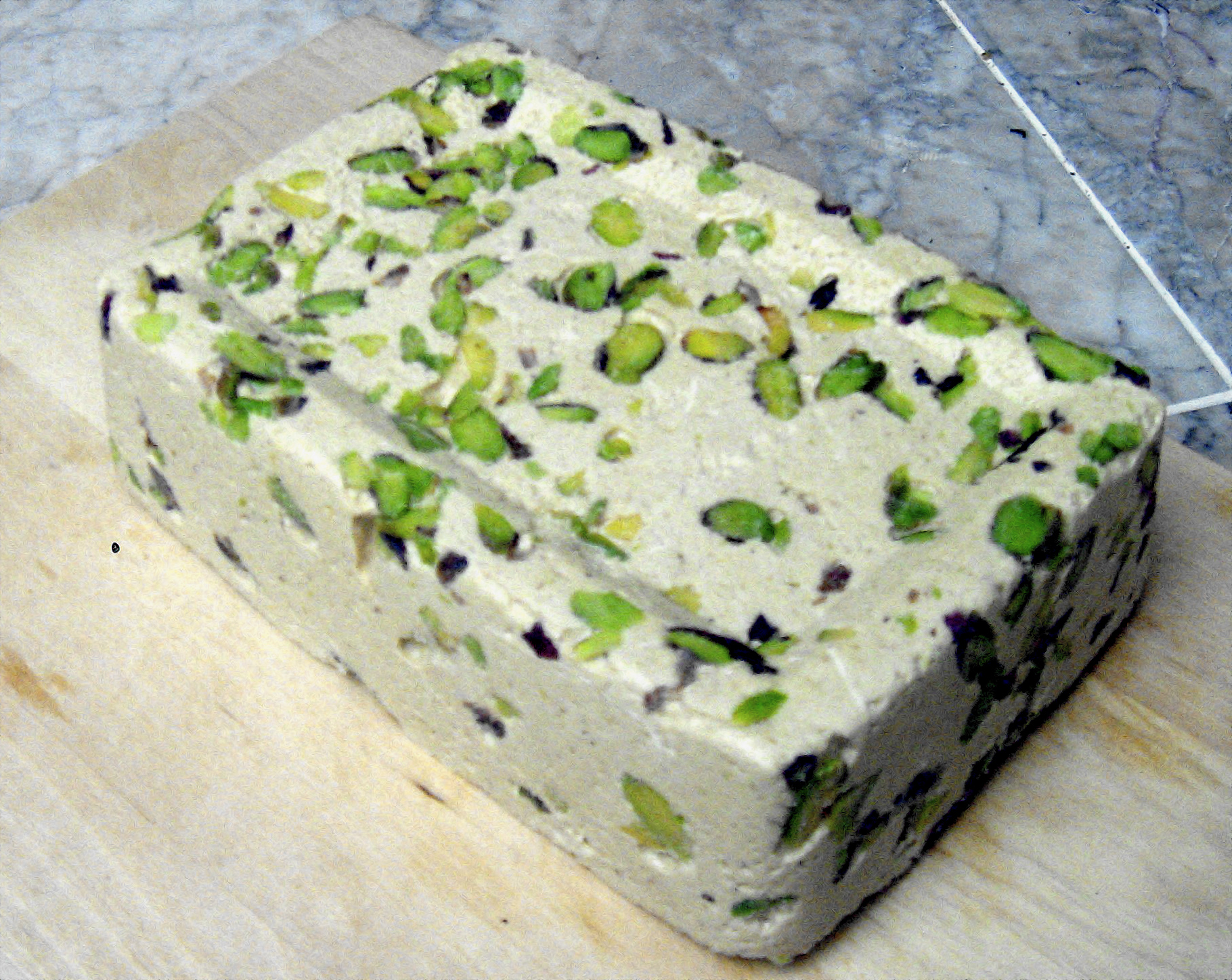
A tahini-based halva with pistachios

The name halva (халва) is used for several related varieties of the Middle Eastern dessert. Tahan / tahini halva (тахан / тахини халва) is the most popular version, available in two different types with sunflower and with sesame seed. Traditionally, the regions of Yablanitsa and Haskovo are famous manufacturers of halva.

- Pumpkin dessert (Печена тиква), Roasted pumpkin
- Baklava
- Kadaif
- Revane
- Buhti with yogurt
- Tolumbi (толумби) – fried choux pastry cakes soaked in syrup which is usually made with honey
- Cookies "Peach" or Praskovki
- Fruit bread
- Biscuit cake
- Torta Garash (Garash cake)
- Katmi with jam or honey or cheese (today usually with added chocolate)
- Skalichki
- Kazanlak Donuts
- Kazanlak Korabii (Казанлъшки курабии) – a scone like pastry that is egg washed and sprinkled with sugar
- Keks – similar to marble cake
- Kompot
- Kozunak
- Kurabiiki
- Lokum
- Maslenki
- Milk with rice
- Oshav
- Tart with cherries or sour cherries – traditionally from Bobov dol
- Tart with different fruits
- Tatlii
- Tikvenik
Bulgarian sweets
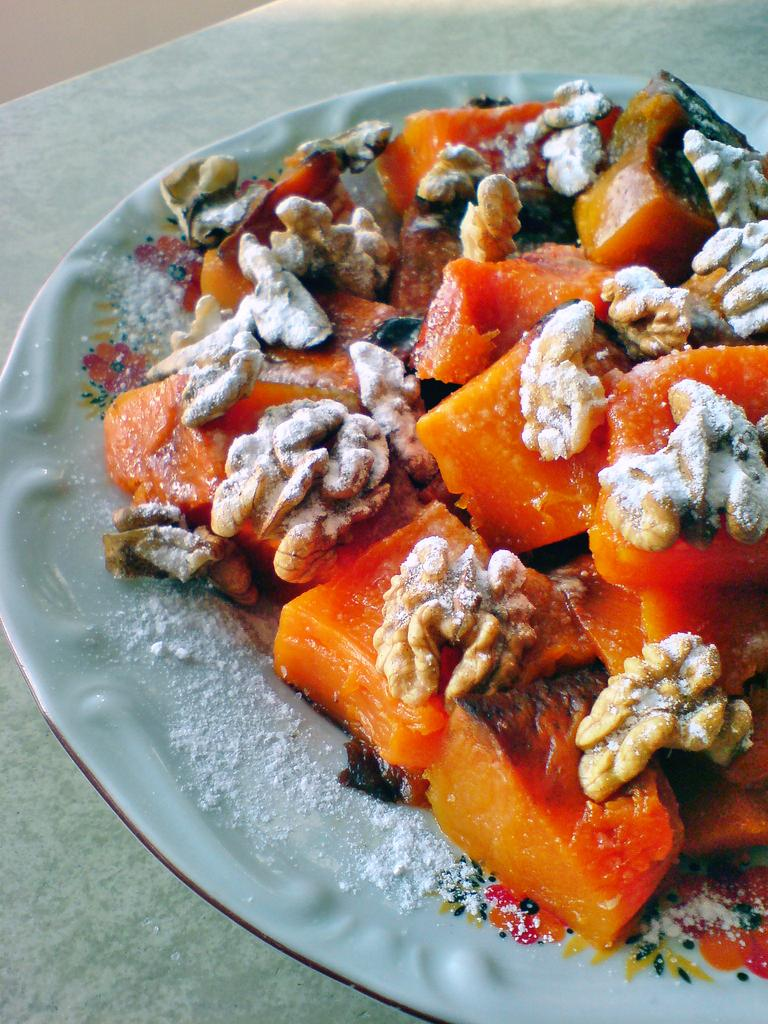
Baked pumpkin with walnuts

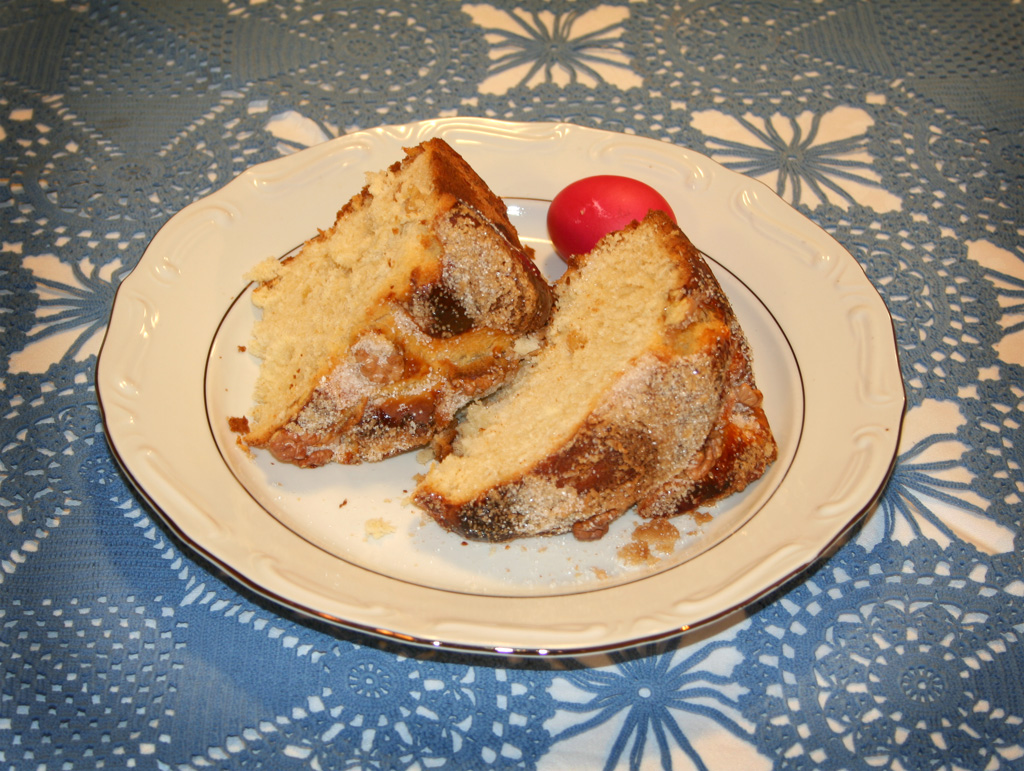
Kozunak as prepared in Bulgaria for Orthodox Easter

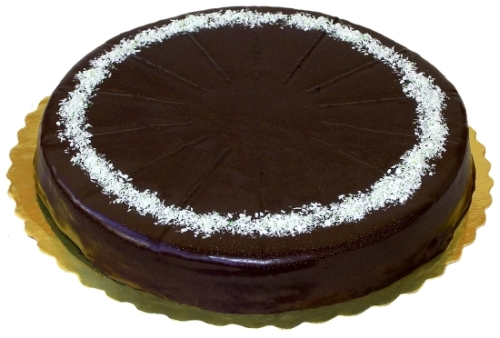
Garash cake

=== Spices and herbs ===
- Summer savory (chubritsa)
- Spearmint (djodjen)
- Sharena sol
- Samardala

=== Other staples ===
- Honey

== Traditional Bulgarian drinks ==
=== Wine ===
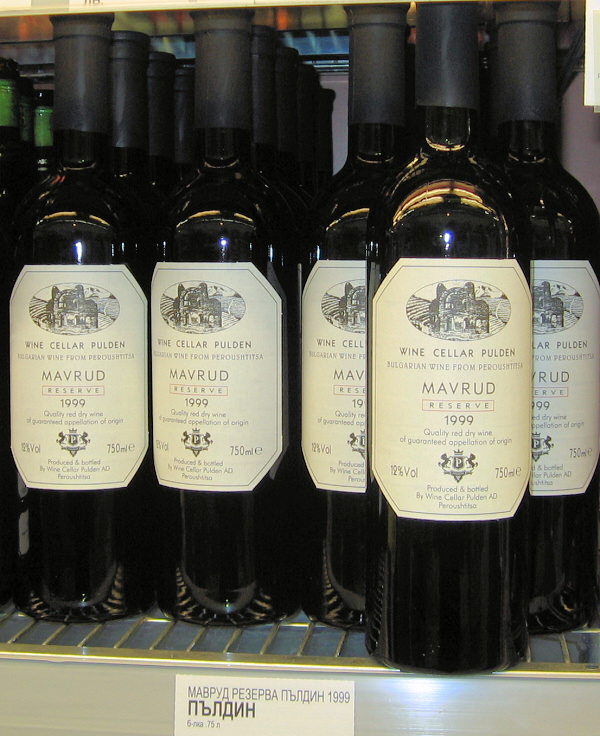
Perushtitsa Mavrud wine

- Mavrud
- Pamid
- Gamza
- Melnik wine
- Dimyat
- Misket
- Muskat
- Nohan or Lipa
- Divachka
- Shivka
- Rubin
- Tamyanka

=== Beer ===
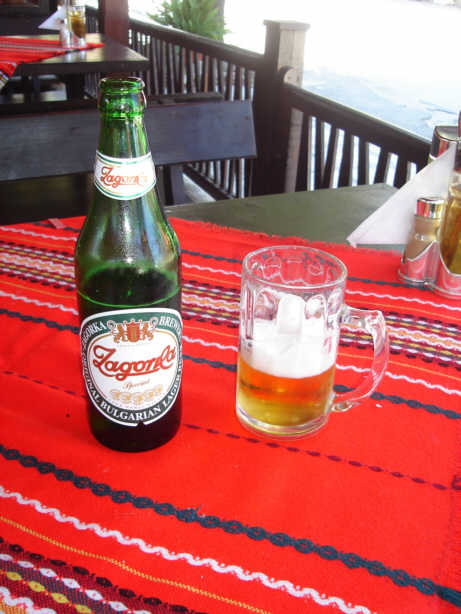
A bottle of Zagorka in a traditional mehana

- Ariana
- Astika
- Boliarka
- Burgasko
- Britos
- Kamenitza
- Ledenika
- Lomsko
- MM
- Pirinsko
- Plevensko
- Shumensko
- Stolichno
- Zagorka

=== Distilled liqueurs ===
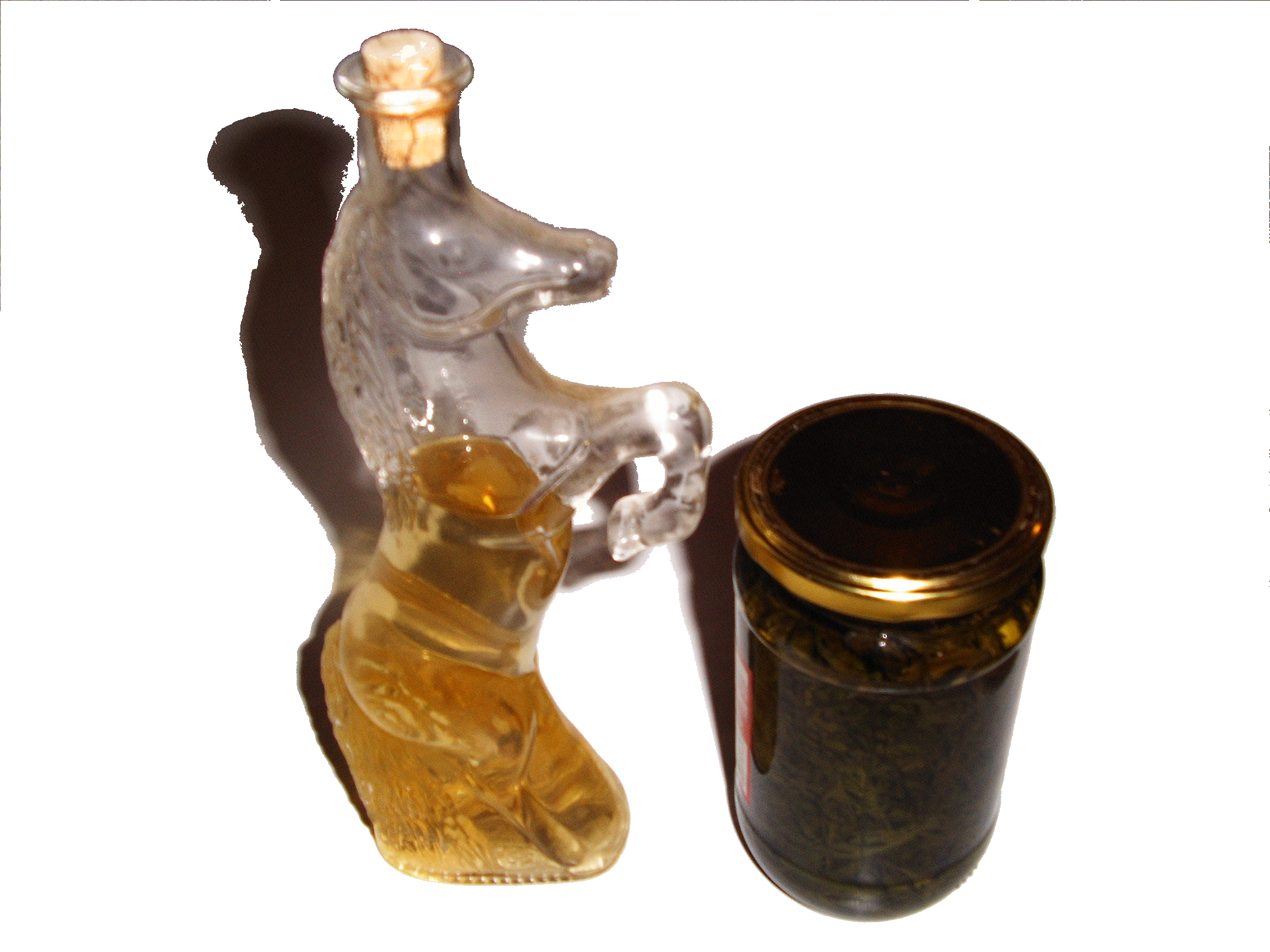
Pelin wine is a bitter liqueur based on wormwood

- Rakia
  - Slivovitsa
  - Gyulova rakia (rose rakia)
  - Muskat rakia
- Mastika
- Menta
- Pelin wine

=== Fermented beverages ===
- Boza – the most popular recipes are from Radomir and Lyubimets
- Ayran (or ayryan) – cold, yogurt-based beverage
- Matenitsa – Bulgarian buttermilk

=== Hot beverages ===
- Tea – usually prepared with one or several herbs, rose, or fruits
- Greyana rakia (boiled rakia) – winter alcoholic beverage
- Greyano vino (mulled wine) – winter alcoholic beverage
- Turkish coffee - coffee brewing method

== See also ==
- European cuisine
- List of cuisines
- Cuisine of the Mediterranean
- Eastern European cuisine
- Macedonian cuisine
