= Princess (food) =

Bulgarian open-faced baked sandwiches

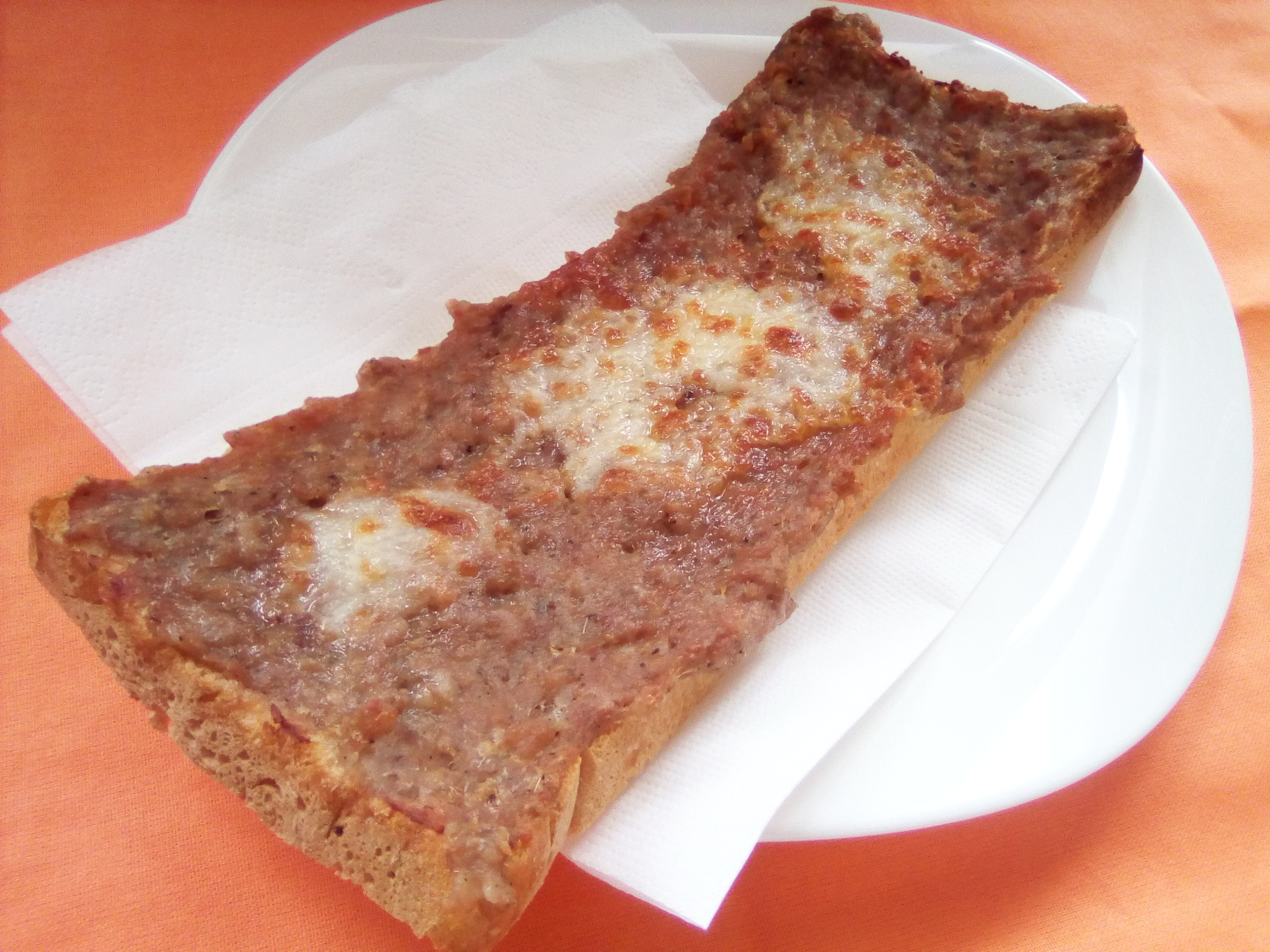
A princess sandwich with minced meat and kashkaval

Princesses (Bulgarian: Принцеси) are Bulgarian open-faced baked sandwiches prepared with minced meat, often eaten for breakfast and sold as fast food. When prepared at home, princesses are usually bread-slice-sized and baked in an oven or an electric grill, but the fast-food version is longer, made from a whole bread that has been sliced through its longitude resulting in a loaf-sized sandwich that may or may not be baked on a charcoal barbecue grill. There may or may not be kashkaval (yellow cheese) on top of the sandwich and people often garnish a princess with mayonnaise, ketchup, mustard or ljutenica, depending on their taste.

Other open-faced baked sandwiches are also sometimes called princesses in Bulgaria, such as princesses with eggs and sirene, or princesses with kashkaval or kashkaval and ham.

Some people call meat princesses, especially the long ones that are barbecued, strandjanki.

== Preparation ==
Ground beef is mixed with eggs and finely chopped onion in a bowl, and then garnished with black pepper, savory and different spices like thyme, cumin, coriander, and ginger, depending on the recipe. If the mixture is not soft enough to spread, an extra egg is added, and the mixture is spread over bread slices. A small amount of butter or margarine might be spread on top of the bread slices before applying the minced meat. The sandwiches are then baked in an oven and served once the meat has browned.

Sharena sol (literally "colorful salt"; a type of spice mix containing salt, savory, paprika and other spices) and a spread like mayonnaise, ketchup or mustard are common with meat princesses, typically dispensed from a bottle. Different kinds of ljutenica are also eaten with those meat sandwiches.

Other princess variants are made in the same fashion with the only difference being the filling on top. Spreads are not commonly added to those other variants.

== History ==
Princess sandwiches are a purely Bulgarian invention, as no neighboring country have any similar recipes, and they are a typical socialist dish, most probably invented sometime in the mid-1960s as a clever way to make a satisfying meal without using too much of the expensive at the time meat, and even though they may not be particularly esthetically pleasing, being delicious and easy to make is probably what made these sandwiches popular across the country.

There are different opinions regarding the origin of the name "princess" or "stranjanka", and there is even a somewhat humorous legend involving tsar Ivan Asen II and a local girl that demanded to be made a princess if she manages to feed the king's starving army, which she did by making those sandwiches.

The actual origin of the name is different, though. In communist era Bulgaria, it was very common to brand a recipe or a food product after a place - like a town or a mountain for example (marzipan "Liulin", kashkaval "Vitosha" etc.), or after an event or achievement, like for example the chocolate brand "Amphora" that depict the Panagyurian gold treasure on the box, and in this particular case, the meat sandwiches were branded with the somewhat pompous name "Thracian princess", which was a reference to the excavation of the Mogilan burial mound in the center of Vratsa in 1965–66. However, that name wasn't popular with the people and eventually it became shortened to "a princess", which stuck.
