= Chubritza =

Chubritza may refer to:

- In Bulgarian cuisine, Chubritza is the Bulgarian word for Summer savory, widely used as an herb

music groups performing Bulgarian Folk Music

- Chubritza (band), a California band
- Čubrica (ensemble) a Dutch ensemble
