= Bob chorba =

Bulgarian bean soup

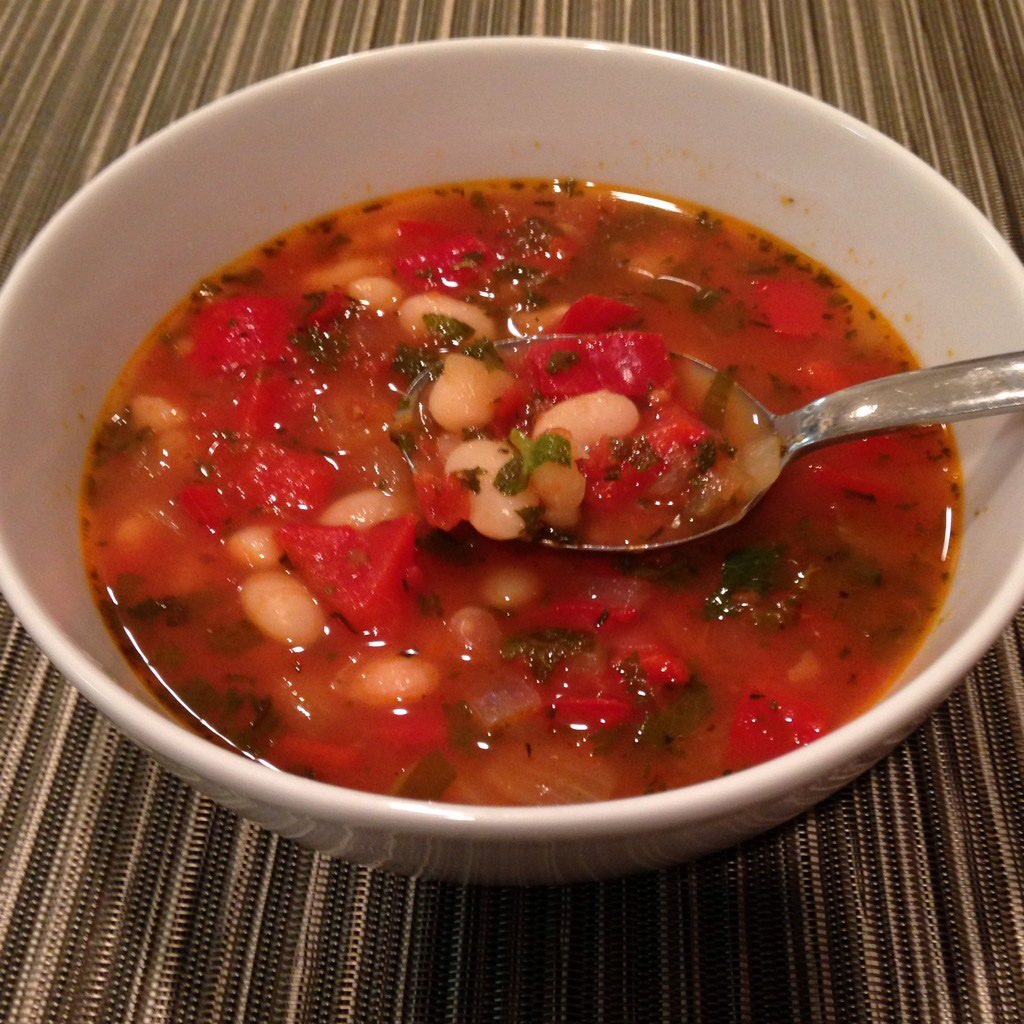
- Bulgarian bean soup with tomatoes and red peppers
- Type: Soup
- Place of origin: Bulgaria
- Main ingredients: Dried beans, onions, tomatoes, chubritza or dzhodzhen (spearmint), carrots
- Variations: Bean soup with sausage

Bob chorba (Bulgarian: боб чорба; lit. "bean soup") is a chorba, a Bulgarian soup. It is made from dry beans, onions, tomatoes, chubritza or dzhodzhen (spearmint) and carrots.

Local variations may also exclude the carrots or include paprika, potatoes or even some kind of meat. Historically, it has been a common soup and staple food at Bulgarian monasteries.

== In popular culture ==
Bob Chorba is frequently featured in Bulgarian cookbooks, food festivals, and culinary tourism promotions. It is often mentioned in media and literature as a symbol of Bulgarian heritage and hospitality.

== See also ==
- Bulgarian cuisine
- List of bean soups
- List of soups
