= Ledenika (beer) =

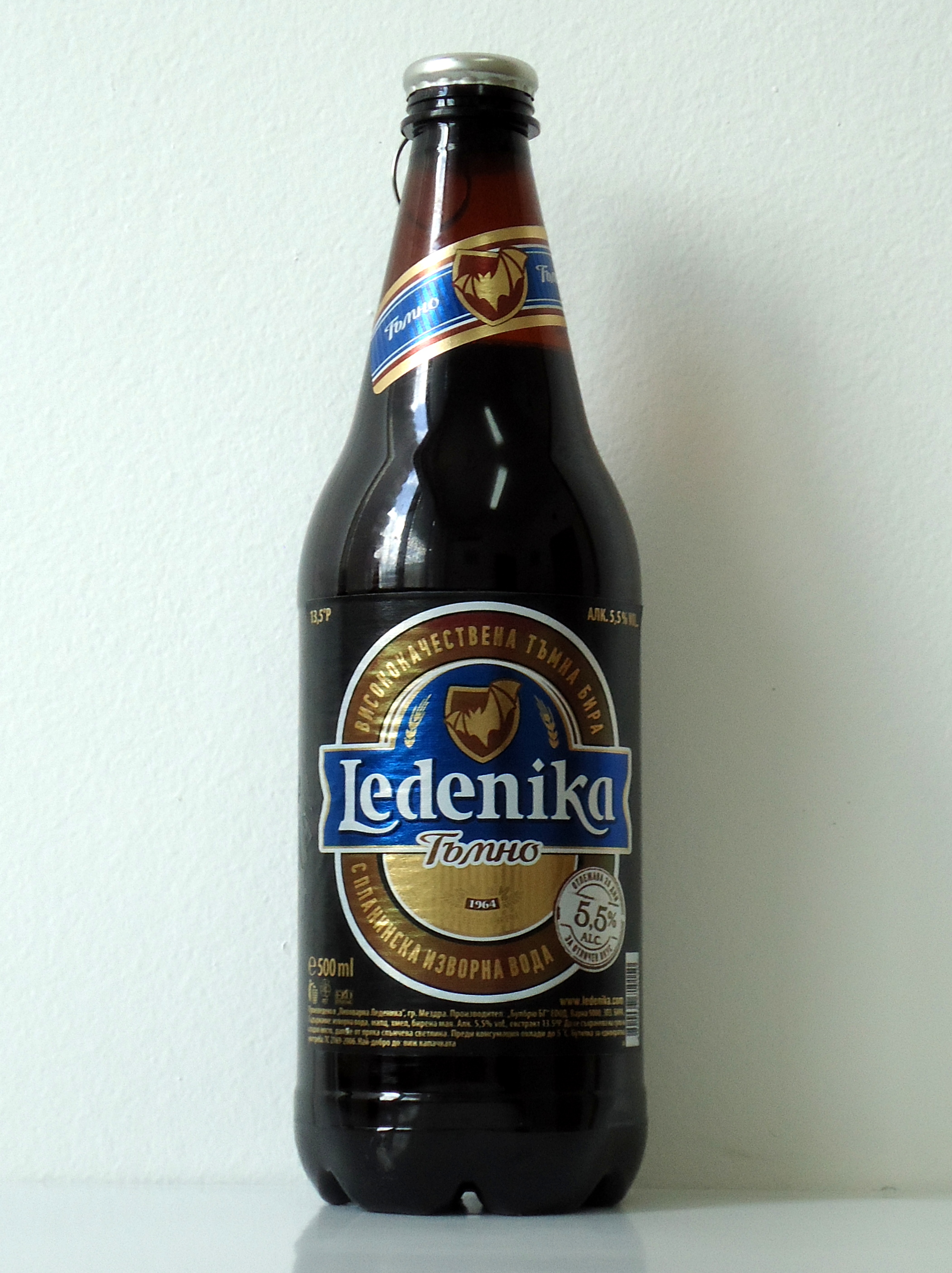

Ledenika (Bulgarian: Леденика) is a Bulgarian beer made in the town of Mezdra, Vratsa Province.

It was established in 1964 and is named after the Ledenika cave near the nearby city of Vratsa in northwestern Bulgaria. In 2012, the Ledenika Brewery was bought by Bolyarka. It has three brands – Ledenika light (4.1% ABV), Ledenika dark, and Ledenika special (5.1% ABV).

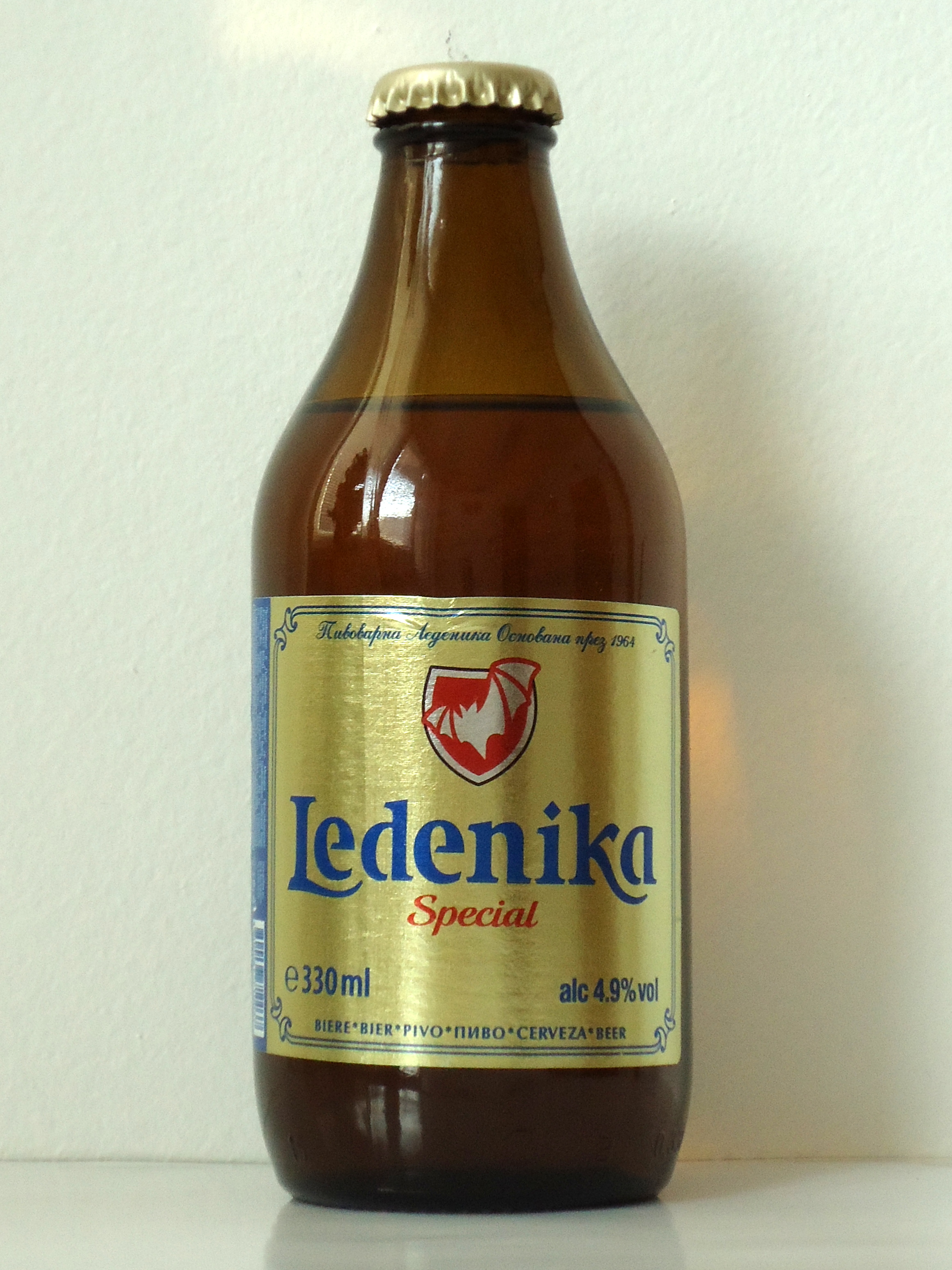
