= Mish-mash (food) =

Bulgarian vegetable dish

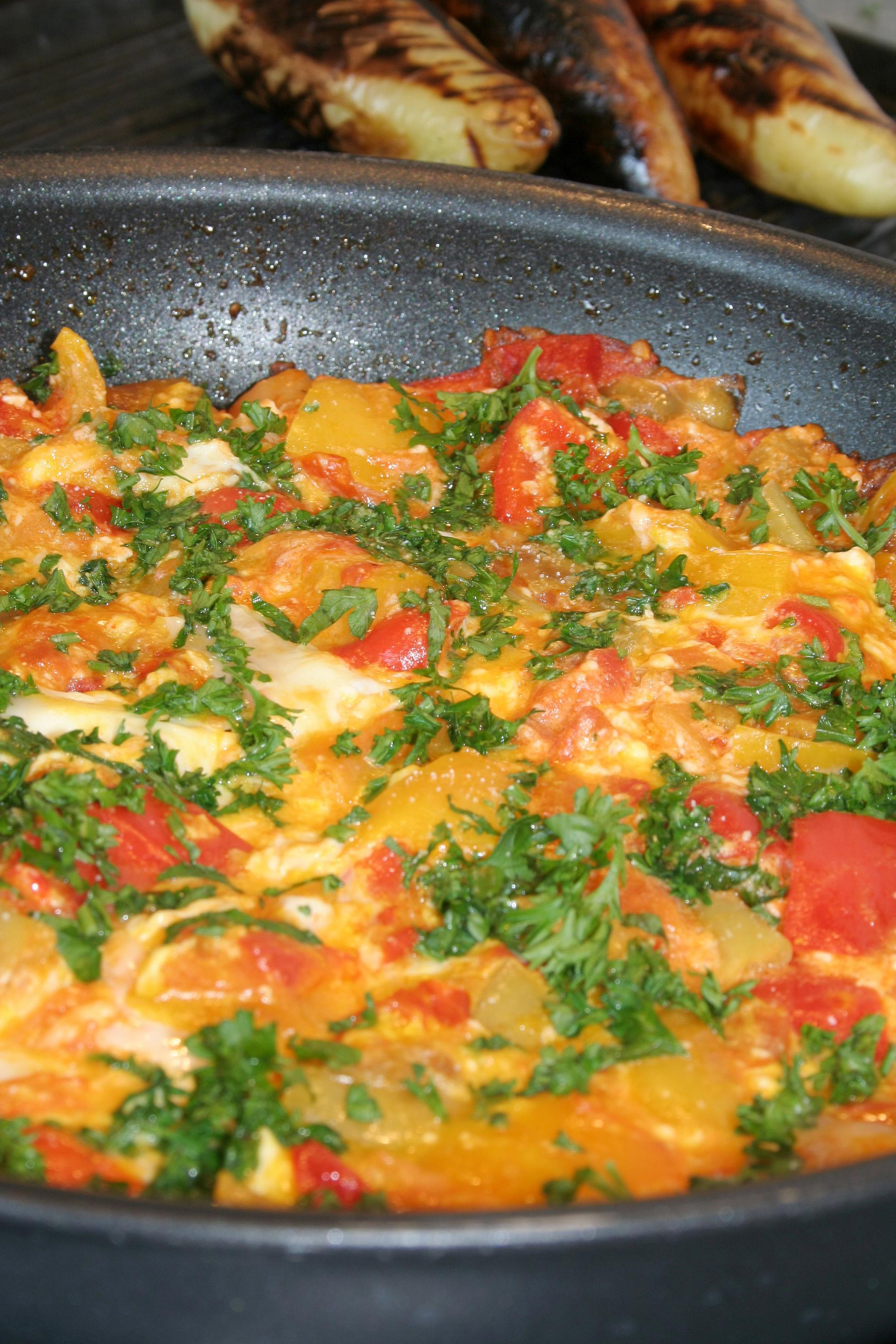
Mish-mash, served on a sach pot

Mish-mash (in Bulgarian: Миш-маш) is a Bulgarian spring dish made with fresh vegetables (typically tomatoes, peppers and onions), eggs and sirene (a type of Balkan brined cheese), and often garnished with freshly cut parsley. There are variations in which garlic, scallions, eggplant, okra or carrots are added to the dish. There are variations without sirene and without onion as well.

== Preparation, serving and consumption ==
Traditionally, mish-mash is made from chopped peppers and tomatoes, which are stewed in hot oil over medium heat. Peppers can be pre-roasted and peeled or cut raw. After that, eggs and feta cheese are added to the mixture to thicken. Parsley is added last, just before putting the mish-mash off heat. It is also possible to prepare the dish in the oven. It is sometimes convenient to prepare the stewed vegetables beforehand and just add eggs and cheese before consumption.

There is no one recipe for making mish-mash, and many different variations of the dish exist. However, common ingredients are listed below:

- Eggs
- Sirene
- Onions
- Tomatoes
- Bell peppers
- Sunflower oil / Vegetable oil / Butter
- Garlic
- Parsley
- Black pepper
- Salt

The dish is usually served warm, as an appetizer or a main dish, often with fresh bread.

== See also ==
- List of vegetable dishes
- List of egg dishes
- Bulgarian cuisine
