= Sharena sol =

Spice mix used in Bulgarian cuisine

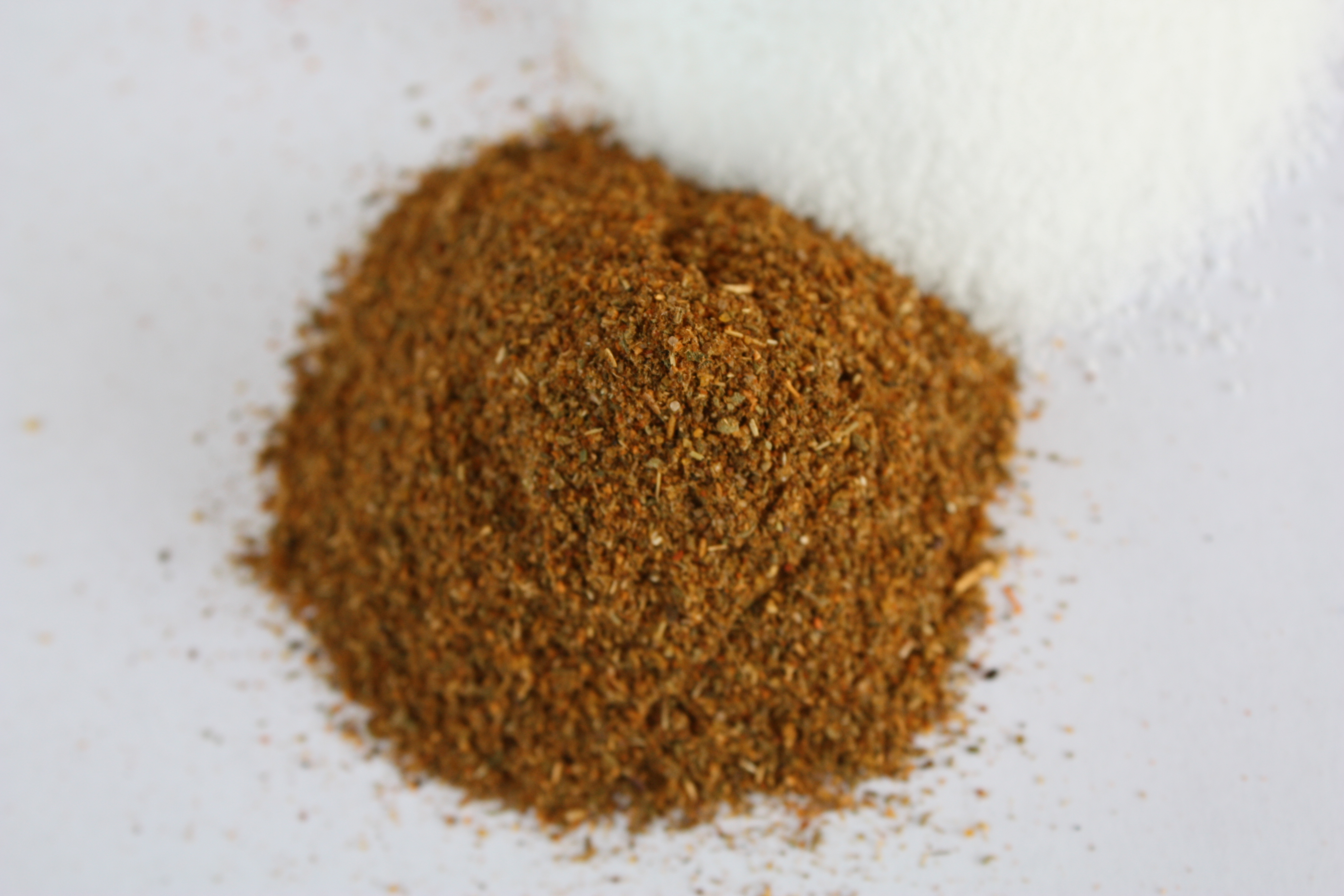
Sharena sol

Sharena sol (Bulgarian: шарена сол, lit. 'particoloured salt'), also known as colourful salt, is a spice mix used extensively in Bulgarian cuisine. Its most typical ingredients are dried summer savory, paprika and salt. In addition, dried fenugreek leaves are frequently added and thyme is not uncommon.
