= Pelin wine =

Pelin wine is made by mixing wine with Artemisia absinthium during fermentation, giving the wine a bitter, refreshing taste. This wine is popular in Eastern-Europe from the 1st of May until the summer. White wine and red wine can both be flavoured with Pelin, the translation of Artemisia absinthium across many Balkan languages such as Romanian, Bulgarian, and others.

Pelin wine differs from absinthe and pelinkovac, which are based on distilled alcohol rather than wine.

== History ==
When the wine was first made, it was stored in amphorae and sealed using a sealant made from fir trees. This sealant added its own flavour to the wine, similar to the flavour which can be found in Greek retsina (Greek: Ρετσίνα). During the Roman era, the amphorae were replaced with wooden barrels; however, these did not seal very well, which resulted in the wine turning into vinegar. In order to prevent this, people began adding Artemisia absinthium to the wine while it was fermenting. During the Communist era, Pelin wine remained very popular, but most of the traditions associated with it were lost in the first decade after the that era passed. In recent years, though, these traditions have been revived and the wine producers have started to make Pelin wine according to traditional recipes again.

== Preparation ==
Traditional recipes for Pelin wine use a mixture of dried absinthe flowers and absinthe stems (approximately 150-250g / hl). The exact proportions of dried flowers (which give the drink its signature flavour) and stems (which give the drink a more bitter taste) vary from producer to producer, meaning that different Pelin wines each have a unique taste. The wine and flower mixture must be fermented in a textile gauze bag for between five and seven days, with frequent tasting used to determine the exact amount of fermentation time. If the mixture is allowed to ferment for too long, it produces an unpleasant bitter taste. Various other ingredients can be added, including mint, yarrow, chamomile, melilot, sliced quince, apple (0.3-0.5 kg/hl), and crushed rosehips (20-100g/hl).

== See also ==
- Vermouth
