= Pumpkin dessert =

Pumpkin dessert may refer to:

- Pumpkin pie
- Kabak tatlisi, a Turkish and Armenian dish made with pumpkin
- Filhós, a traditional Christmas dessert in Portugal often made with pumpkin
- Zuccotto ("little pumpkin"), an Italian cuisine dessert made using a pumpkin shaped mold
