= Garash cake =

Austrian chocolate and walnut cake

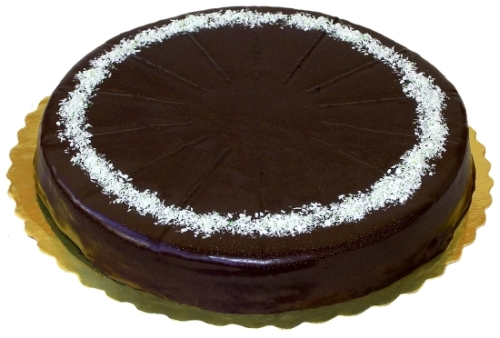
- Type: Cake
- Place of origin: Ruse, Bulgaria
- Main ingredients: Walnuts, egg whites, crystal or powdered sugar

Garash is a chocolate cake from Bulgarian cuisine. It was created by the Austro-Hungarian chef Kosta Garash in 1885 in Ruse, Bulgaria, during the time he managed the grand hotel “Islah Hane”, which was located next to the residence of the Bulgarian Knyaz Alexander of Battenberg. Royal figures, such as Carol I of Romania, Milan I of Serbia, and Oscar II of Sweden, were guests at the hotel. Kosta Garash created his famous "Garash" cake for such high-ranking receptions.

"Garash" cake has recently become a favorite of people with Gluten-related disorders, since no wheat flour is used in the recipe.

== Preparation ==
Five 2-mm-thin round cake plates are made from a batter consisting of 200 g ground walnut kernels, 8 egg whites and 220 g crystal or powdered sugar. After baking and cooling, they are arranged one on top of the other and frosted in between, on top, and on the sides with a ganache-style frosting made of sweet cream and chocolate. Afterwards, the cake is covered with chocolate icing.

== See also ==
- List of desserts
