= Bolyarka =

Bulgarian beer brand

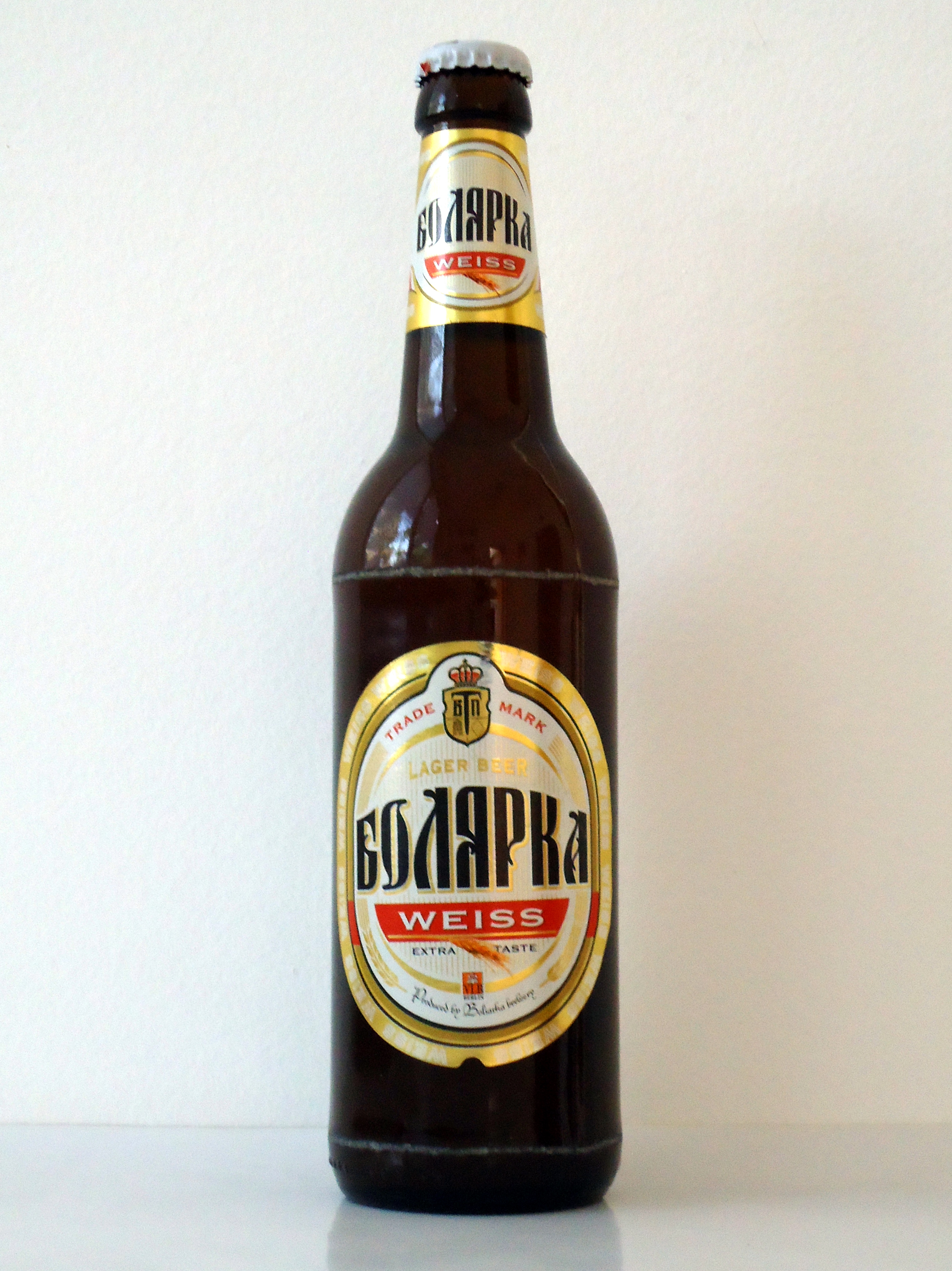
Bolyarka Weiss

Bolyarka is a Bulgarian beer brand (Bulgarian: Болярка) from the city of Veliko Tarnovo. The company was founded in 1892 by the Hadji Slavchevi brothers, five years after the first brewery in Tarnovo was founded in 1887 by the German Artur Wilser. During the latter part of the 20th century the beer was called simply Velikotarnovsko pivo, renamed Bolyarka in 2000, in honour of the city's history as the capital of the Second Bulgarian Empire and home of the bolyars.

The company currently has four own brands –

- Bolyarka Light (Болярка светло, 4.1% ABV)
- Bolyarka Dark (Болярка тъмно, 5% ABV)
- Bolyarka Weiss (Болярка вайс, wheat beer, 5.4% ABV)
- Bolyarka Live (Болярка живо, ale)

The company brews several other Bulgarian brands, such as Schweik and Balkansko, and it also imports several brands, including Warsteiner and Kaltenberg.

== Gallery ==
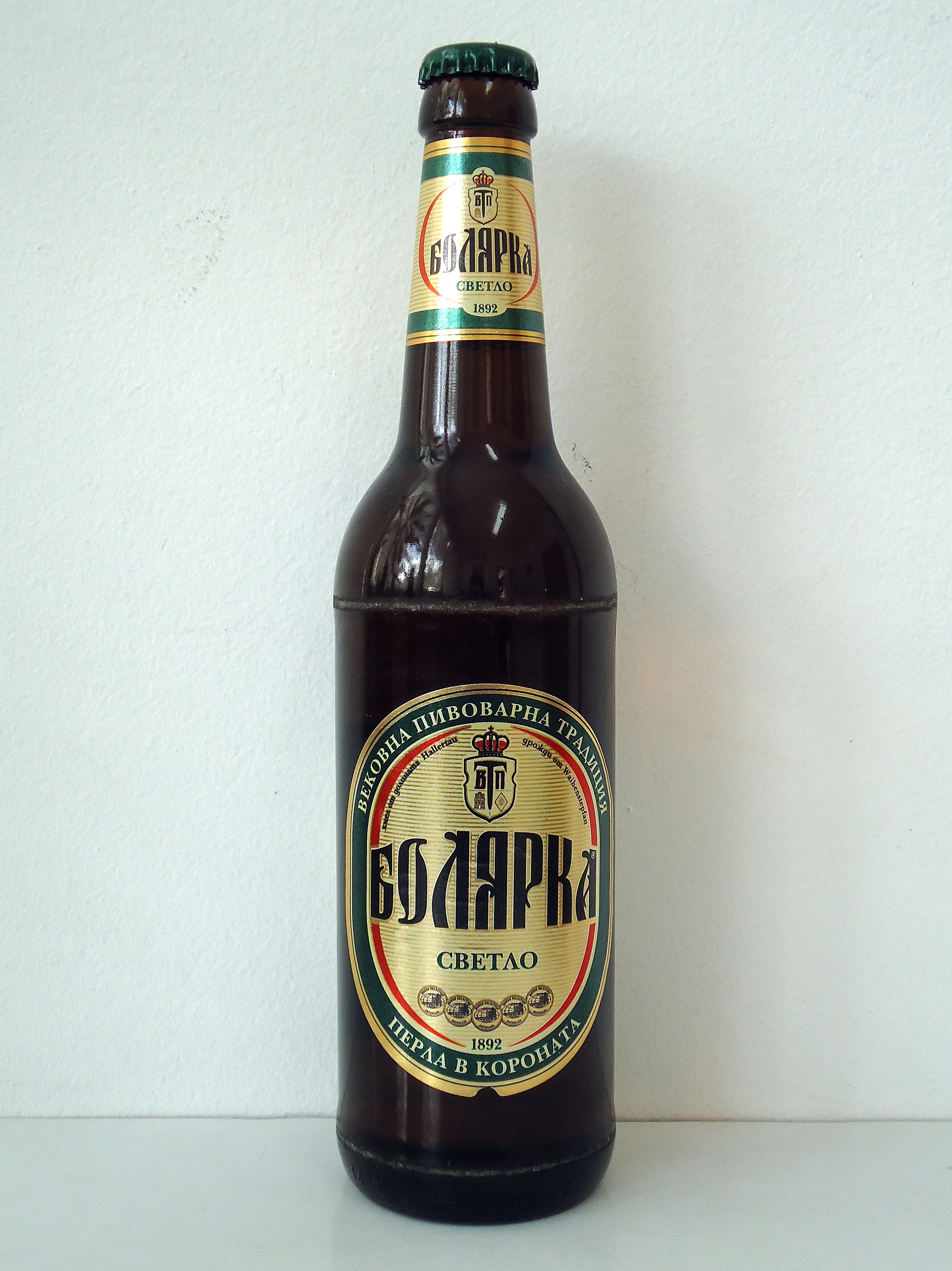
Bolyarka Light

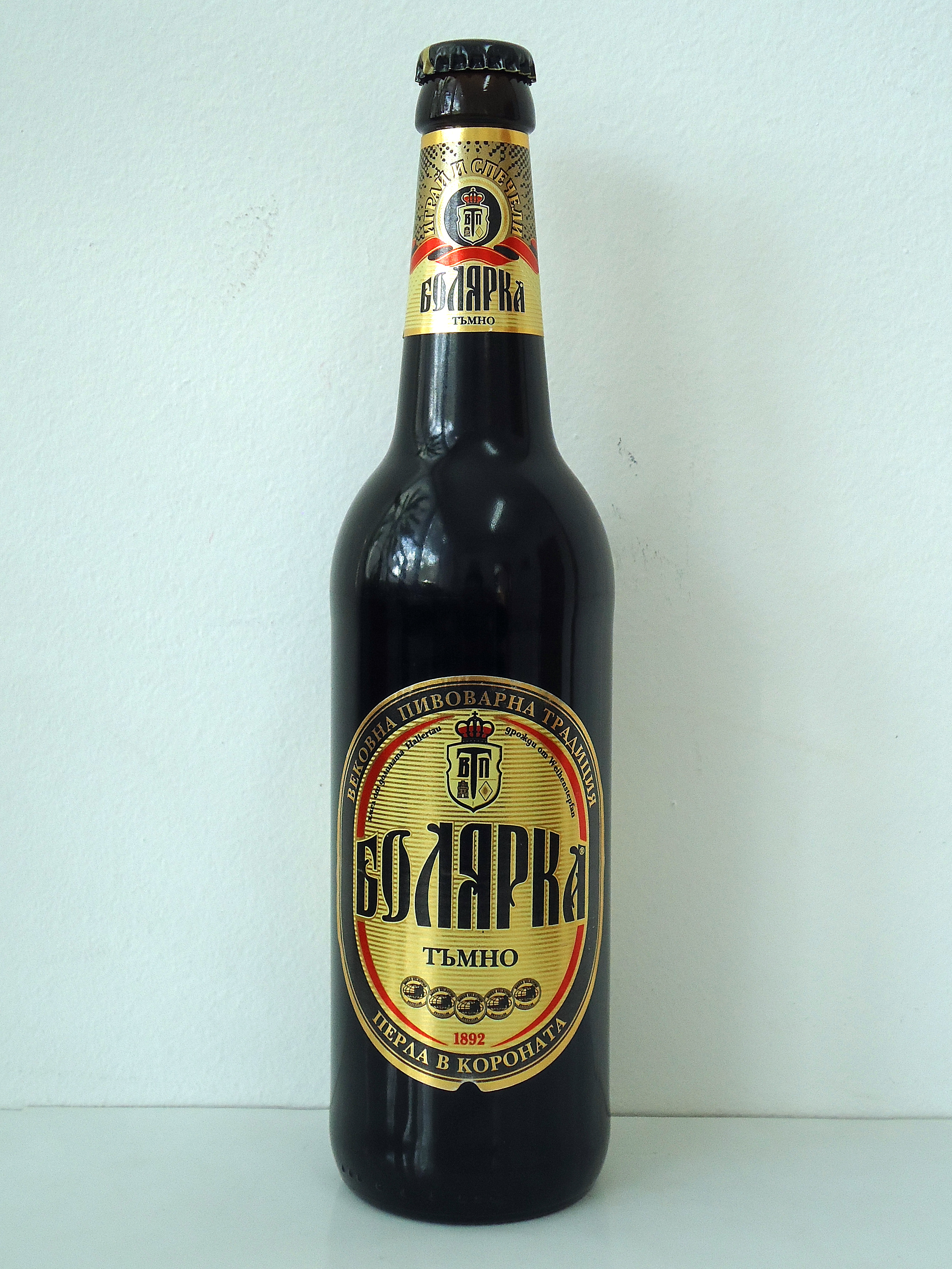
Bolyarka Dark
