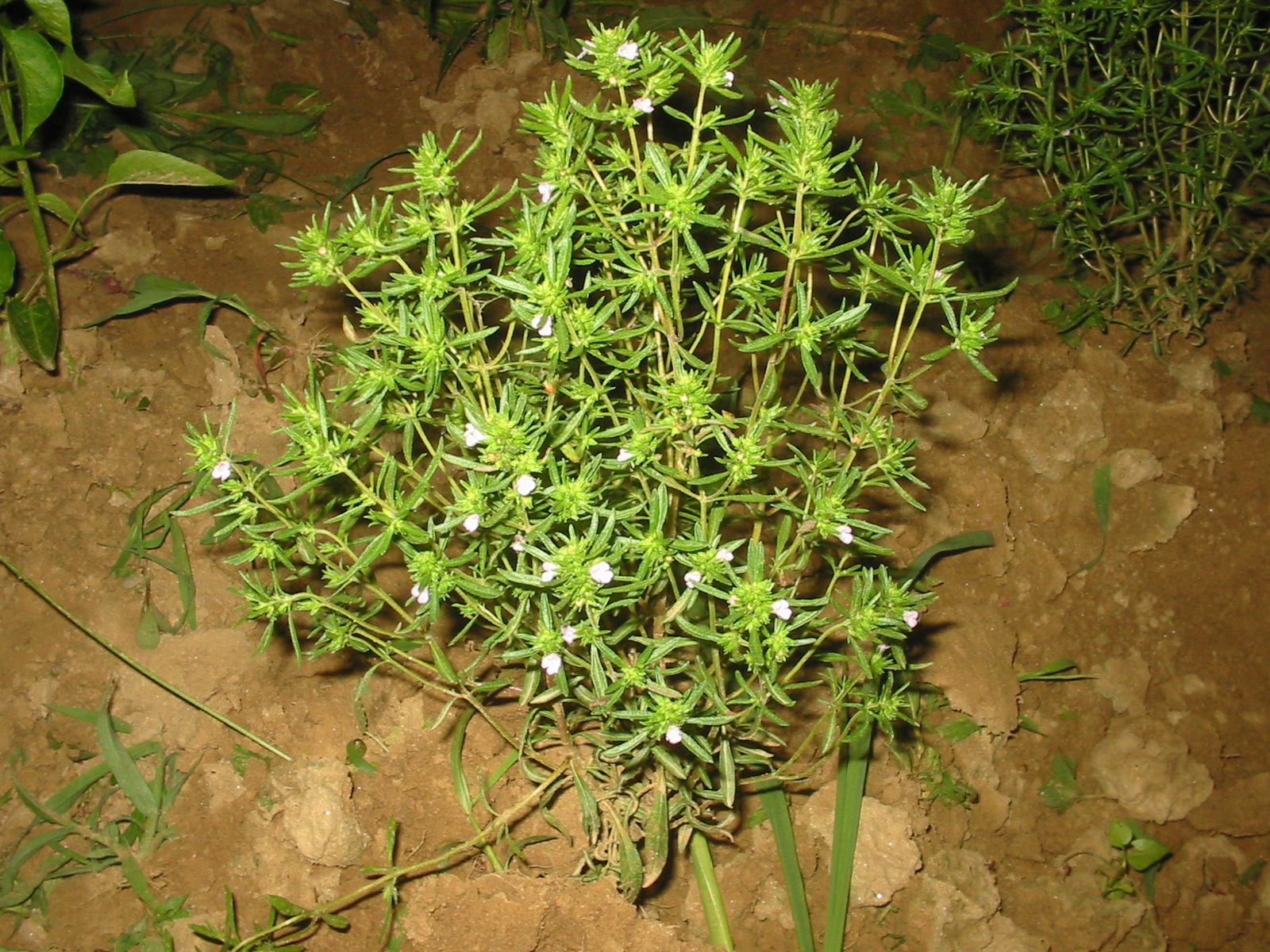

Scientific classification
- Kingdom: Plantae
- Clade: Tracheophytes
- Clade: Angiosperms
- Clade: Eudicots
- Clade: Asterids
- Order: Lamiales
- Family: Lamiaceae
- Genus: Satureja
- Species: S. hortensis

Binomial name
- Satureja hortensis L.

Synonyms
- Ground Savory

= Summer savory =

Species of flowering plant

Summer savory (Satureja hortensis) is among the best known of the savory genus. It is an annual, but otherwise is similar in use and flavor to the perennial winter savory. It is used more often than winter savory, which has a slightly more bitter flavor.

This herb has lilac tubular flowers which bloom in the northern hemisphere from July to September. It grows to around 30 to 60 cm (1 to 2 ft) in height and has very slender, bronze-green leaves. Savory oil is obtained principally from S. hortensis and S. montana, which are cultivated commercially.

== Taxonomy ==
The species name Satureja hortensis was first published in 1753 by Carl von Linné in Species Plantarum, Volume II (page 568). Homotypic synonyms are Clinopodium hortense (L.) (Kuntze, 1891) and Thymus cunila (E.H.L.Krause, 1903). Heterotypic synonyms are Clinopodium pachyphyllum (K.Koch, Kuntze, 1891), Satureja altaica (Boriss., 1953), Satureja brachiata (Stokes, 1812), Satureja filicaulis (Schott ex Boiss., 1879), Satureja hortensis var. distans (K.Koch, 1849), Satureja laxiflora subsp. zuvandica (D.A.Kapan., 1987), Satureja litwinowii (Schmalh. ex Lipsky, 1899), Satureja officinarum (Crantz, 1766), Satureja pachyphylla (K.Koch, 1844), Satureja viminea (Burm.f., 1768) and Satureja zuvandica (D.A.Kapan., 1985).

== Distribution ==
Summer savory is native to Southeastern Europe and Asia. It was introduced to North America and regions across Europe and West Asia.

== History ==
The Latin name Satureja hortensis comes from Roman writer Pliny the Elder, and it is said to be a derivative of the word satyr. Legends state that the herb belonged to this ancient creature, which led to the name satureja. Their primary use during the Roman times was in cooking. It was used to flavour foods until black pepper made its way to Europe, which replaced most of summer savory's uses. During the reign of Julius Caesar the Romans introduced the herb to England, where it also became a popular herb for cooking and was used in medicine. The English name comes from the Saxons who called it savory for its pungent taste. In the 17th century the English botanist Nicolas Culpeper wrote that the herb had wind expelling properties, making summer savory more used in medical purposes. The herb was first cultivated in the 19th century; previously, it was harvested as a wild growing shrub.

In the 21st century, summer savory is cultivated in France, Spain, Germany, England and other parts of Europe, Canada and the United States of America. When bought for culinary use, the herb contains both dried leaves and flowers.

== Habitat ==
Summer savory can grow from propagated seeds in a moderately fertile environment, usually in a rich, light soil, as they usually take longer to germinate. Usually, this species prefers dry gravel and stone slopes of up to 1500 meters as their habitat. This herb can be grown in pots, ornamental borders and herb gardens and is an excellent companion plant that can deter aphids when grown next to broad beans.

== Ecology ==
Summer savory grows wild but it is also beneficial for the garden ecosystem since it attracts various pollinators. Because of its tubular flower shape, the nectar is encapsulated in the flower which makes it hard to reach for pollinators. The main pollinators of summer savory are bees, bumblebees, wasps, Bombyliidae and hoverflies, which support plant reproduction and seed production. Diaspores are the seeds which are dispersed by ants through a process known as myrmecochory.

The flowers of summer savory are more modest in appearance and, just as with chamomile and thyme, tend to attract a greater number of beneficial insects compared to for example roses and chrysanthemums that are often favored for their beauty. This makes it an option for gardeners looking to encourage biodiversity and provide food for these crucial pollinators while also being easily cultivated from seed or cutting.

The early spring seedlings are often topped for fresh use in June. When the plants are in flower, they may be pulled up and dried for winter use. Summer savory can be collected when the plant reaches around 15 centimetres in height and when it is in full flowering stage. It reaches that point after approximately 75–120 days. To promote further growth the tops should be regularly trimmed. For storage, the plant needs to be dried by hanging it up in little bundles. Once dry, the leaves need to be removed in order to store them in sealed jars and once the seeds brown, they can be preserved with a desiccant in a similar airtight manner.

The plant only lives for a single summer which makes it an annual plant.

== Uses ==
=== Cuisine ===
Summer savory is a traditional popular herb in Atlantic Canada, where it is used in the same way sage is elsewhere. It is the main flavoring in dressing for many fowl, mixed with ground pork and other basic ingredients to create a thick meat dressing known as cretonnade (cretonade) which may be eaten with turkey, goose and duck. It also is used to make stews such as fricot, and in potato cakes and meat pies. It is usually available year-round in local grocery stores in dried form and is used in varying proportions, sometimes added to recipes in large spoonfuls (such as in cretonnade), and sometimes more subtly (as in beans, for which savory has a natural affinity).

Summer savory is a characteristic ingredient of herbes de Provence. It is also widely used as a seasoning for grilled meats and barbecues, as well as in stews and sauces.

Summer savory is preferred over winter savory for use in sausages because of its sweeter, more delicate aroma. It plays an important role in Bulgarian cuisine, providing a strong flavor to a variety of dishes. Instead of salt and pepper, a Bulgarian table will have three condiments: salt, red sweet pepper, and summer savory. When these are mixed it is called sharena sol (шарена сол 'speckled salt').

Summer savory, known as cimbru, is used in Romanian cuisine, especially in sarmale (stuffed cabbage or grape leaf rolls) and in mititei (grilled ground meat rolls).

=== Alcohol ===
Regarding its use in alcohol, summer savory is not often used as an ingredient in alcoholic beverages. But with its flavour profile, it is an addition to some artisanal or craft spirits and liqueurs. The herb, known for its pungent piney flavor with peppery hints, could impart a spicy, peppery note to such beverages, potentially complementing other botanicals since it is often compared to a cross between mint and thyme.

Given summer savorys traditional use in vinegar preservation by the ancient Romans, it can be infused in vinegar-based cocktails or used as a garnish to add a subtle, herby touch to certain drinks. In culinary applications, it is also used because of its ability to add a salty and peppery flavor without increasing sodium intake.

=== Phytochemicals ===
Summer savory contains diverse phytochemicals, including steroids, essential oils, and flavonoids. The phenol carvacrol is a major component of this essential oil that finds some culinary applications.

== See also ==
- Winter savory
