= Cretan cuisine =

Culinary tradition

Cretan cuisine (Greek: Κρητική κουζίνα) is the traditional cuisine of the Greek island of Crete.

== Background ==
The core of the Cretan cuisine consists of food derived from plants, whereas food of animal origin was more peripheral in nature. In general, people consumed seasonal products, available in the wider local area, which underwent minimal processing or none at all. The traditional cuisine was widespread in the island until the 1960s when, with improving living standards, alimentary patterns changed towards more meat and other animal-derived produce.

Fresh fruit and dried fruits, pulses, endemic wild herbs and aromatic plants, and rough cereals, whose cultivation was favored by the regional climate, were consumed in great amounts and constituted the base of the Cretan cuisine during that period. Dairy products were consumed on a daily basis in low to moderate quantities. Poultry and fish were consumed on a weekly basis in moderate quantities, whereas red meat was consumed only a few times a month. The main supply of fat was effectuated by olive oil, which was used not only in salads but also in cooking, unlike the northern European countries which primarily used animal fat. Another essential feature of the Cretan cuisine was the moderate use of alcohol, mainly red wine which accompanied meals. Finally, the most common dessert was yogurt and fresh fruits, while traditional pastry based on honey had been consumed a few times a week.

== Appetizers ==
- Dakos (salad)
- Stamnagathi (cichorium) salad
- Piktí (or Tsiladiá), pork charcuterie
- Apáki, smoked pork (or chicken) meat
- Paximadi
- Kalitsounia
- Stafidota, cookies with a stuffing based on raisins
- Kolokythoanthoi
- Raw cardoons
- Askordoulakoi (or Volvoi), pickled bulbs of Tassel hyacinth
- Kolokythopita
- Marathopita
- Mizithropita, mizithra stuffed flatbread
- Sarikopita, cheese pie twisted into shape resembling the "sariki", a type of traditional Cretan headwear
- Sykoti Savore, liver cooked in vinegar
- Staka, buttercream roux
- Graviera cheese
- Xynomizithra cheese
- Xygalo cheese
- Pichtogalo cheese
- Other cheeses include Amarino, Seliano, Tirozouli, Tiromalama

== Specialities ==
- Amygdalopita (dessert)
- Antikristo (or oftó), lamb meat
- Arni me askolibrous, a lamb stew with golden thistle and avgolemono
- Gamopilafo, rice cooked in goat and rooster broth
- Hirino me selino, pork meat with celery
- Ηohlioi boubouristoi, snails fried with rosemary and vinegar
- Katsikaki me stamnagathi, goat meat (alternatively lamb) cooked with avgolemono and a local plant species of the Cichorium genus
- Kreatotourta, meat pie from western Crete
- Pasta, such as skioufichta, magiri, chilofta, and avgochilos
- Patouda (dessert)
- Portokalopita (dessert)
- Rofos me bamies, grouper cooked in the oven with okra
- Sfougato, omelette containing various vegetables (most often potatoes, zucchini and onions) and cheese
- Snails with tomato
- Sofegada, vegetable stew
- Soupies me maratho, cuttlefish with fennel
- Triftoudia, type of orzo
- Tsigariasto, lamb or goat meat dish, typically from the Sfakia region
- Tzoulamas, traditional meat pie from Messara
- Xerotigana (dessert)

== Drinks ==
- Tsikoudia
- Rakomelo
- Cretan wine

== Gallery ==
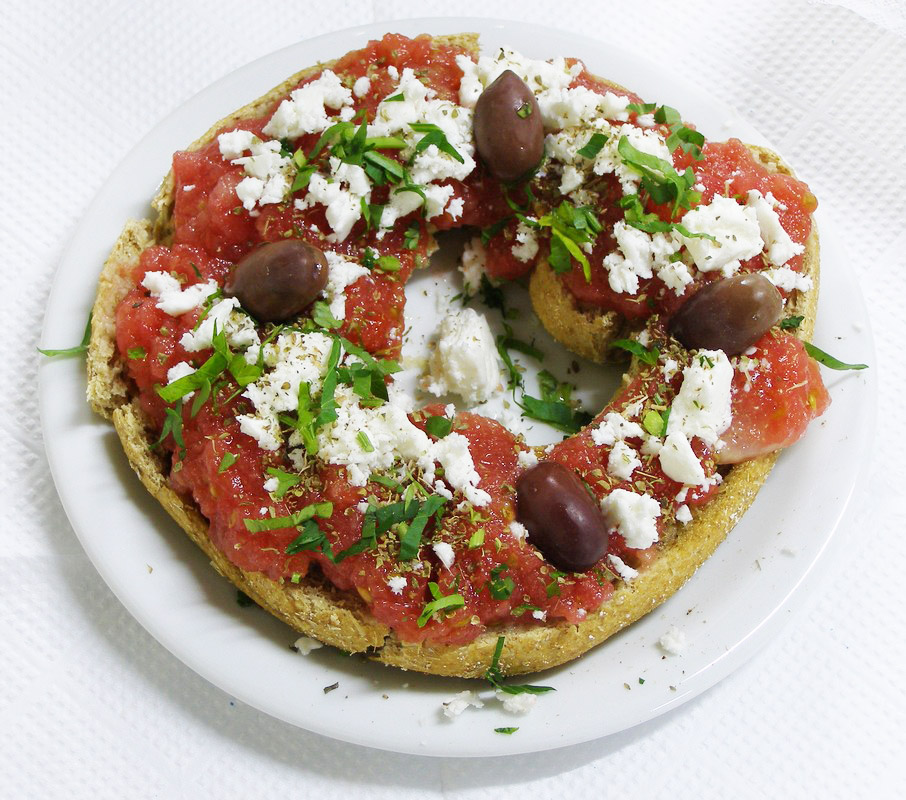
Dakos

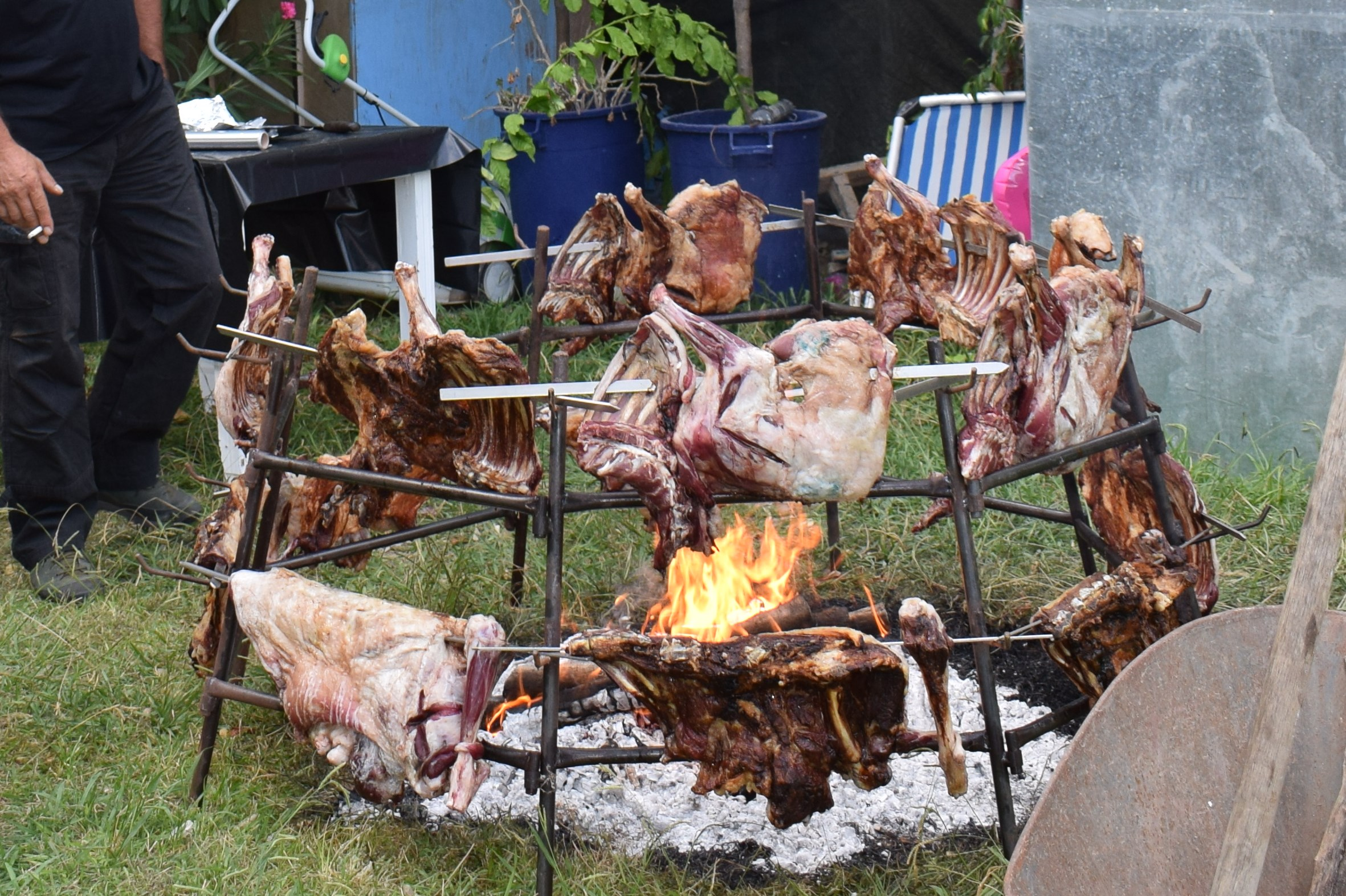
Antikristó (Oftó)

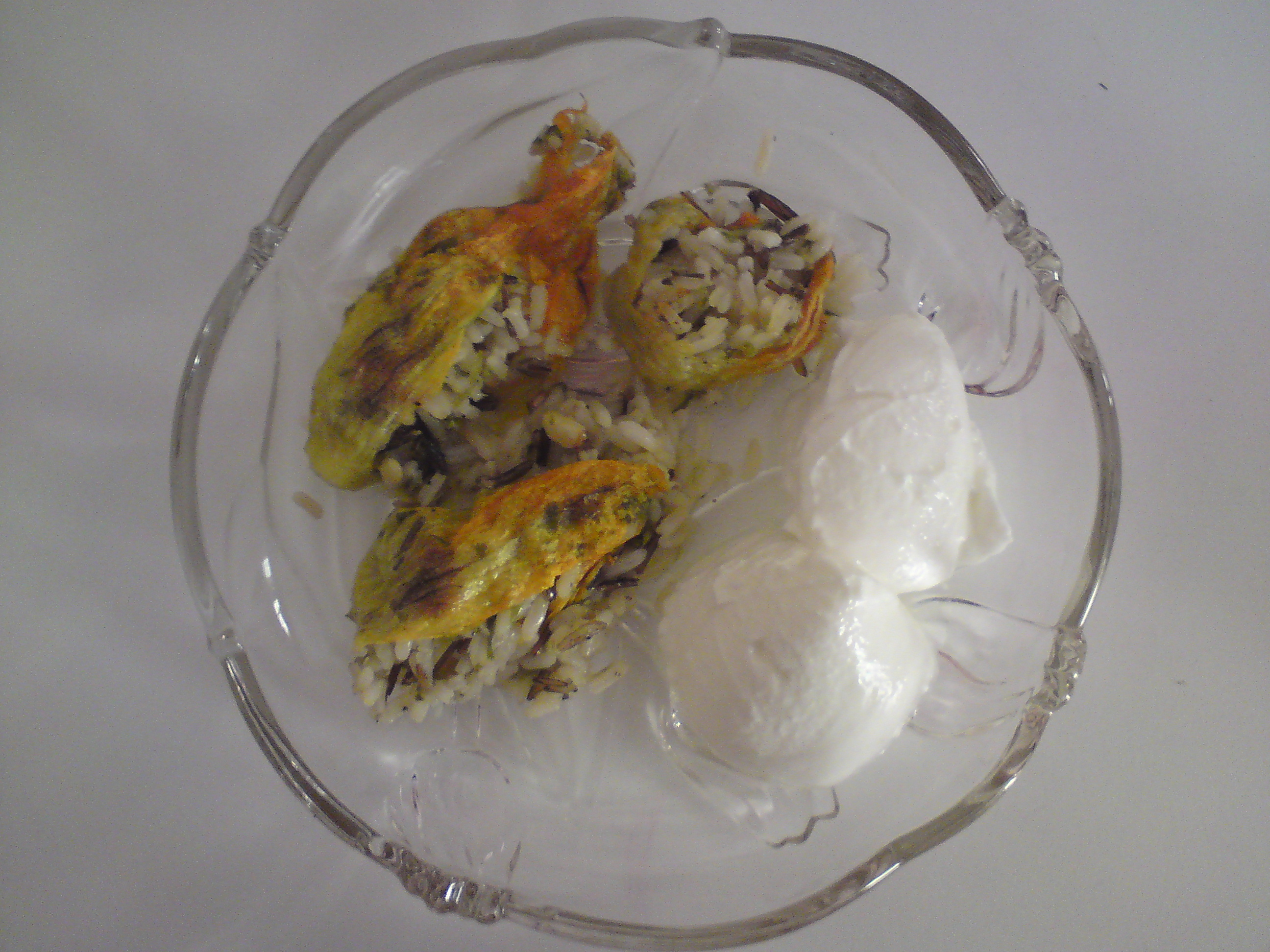
Kolokythoanthoi are often served with a dollop of yoghurt on the side (zucchini flowers)

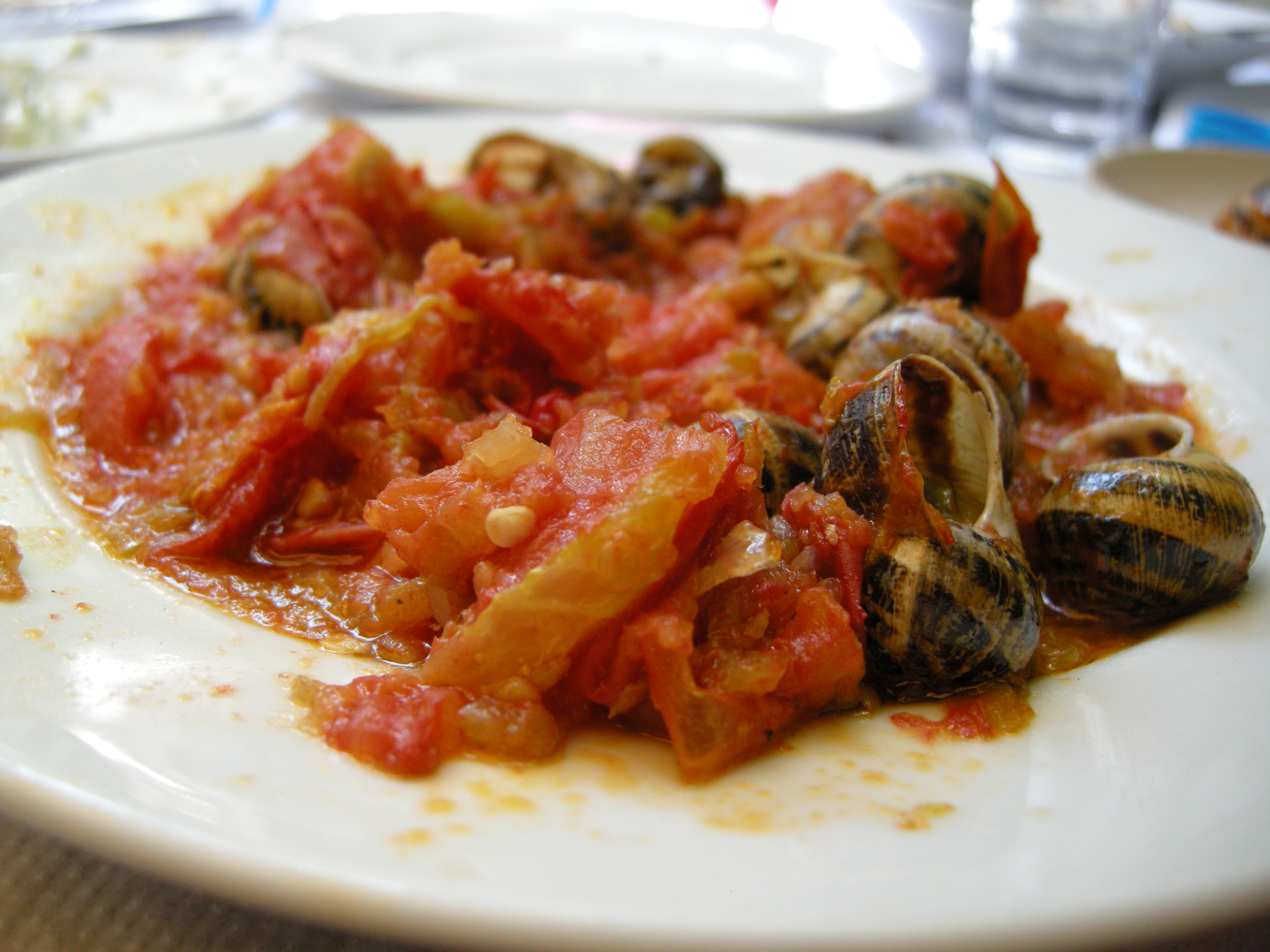
Snails with tomato

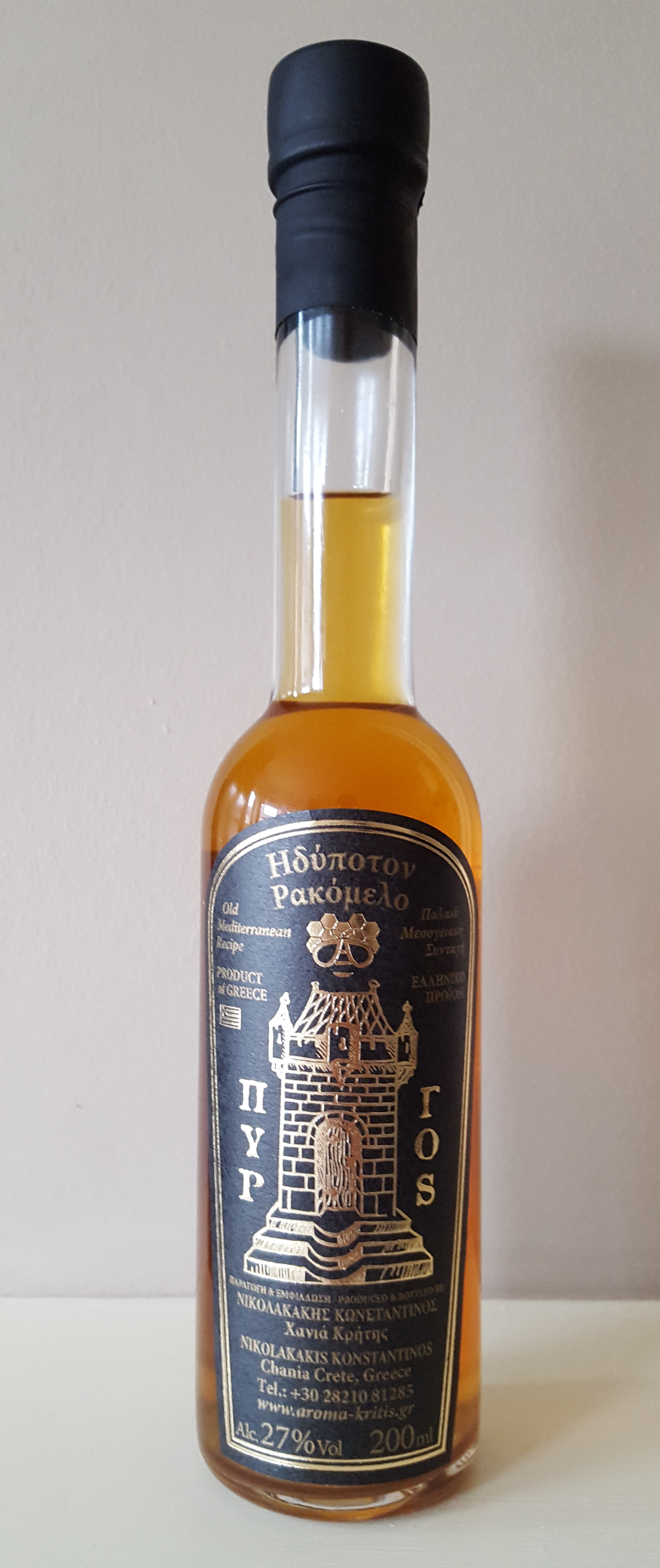
Rakomelo

== See also ==
- Greek restaurant
