= List of bread dishes =

Dishes using bread as a main ingredient, listed by category

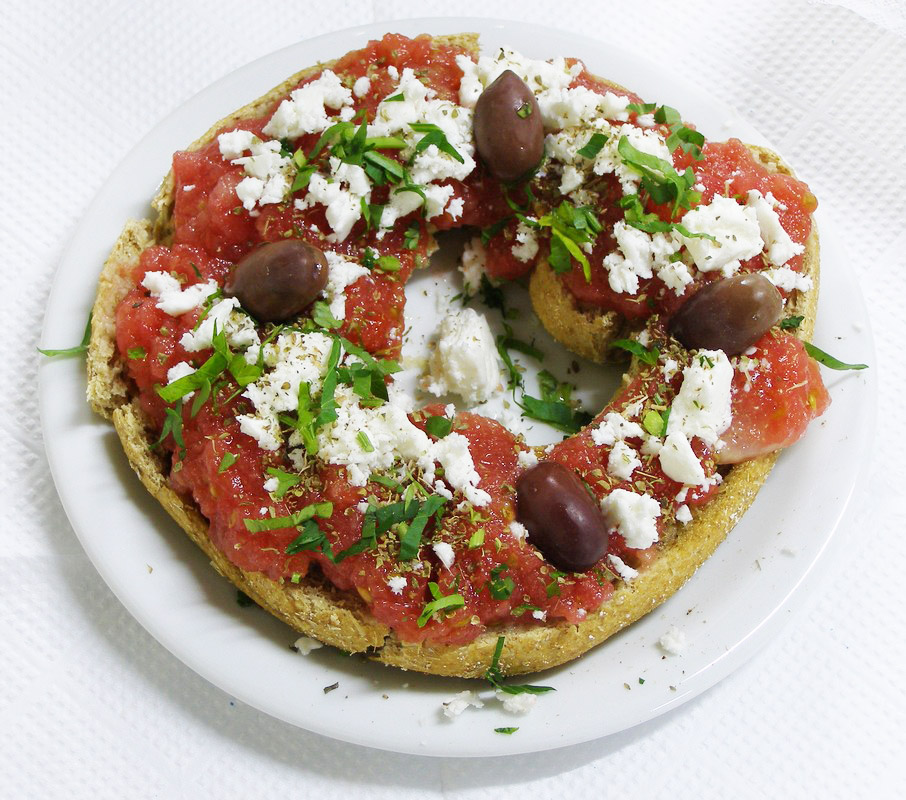
Dakos

This is a list of bread dishes and foods, which use bread as a primary ingredient. Bread is a staple food prepared from a dough of flour and water, usually by baking. Throughout recorded history it has been popular around the world and is one of the oldest artificial foods, having been of importance since the dawn of agriculture.

== Bread dishes ==
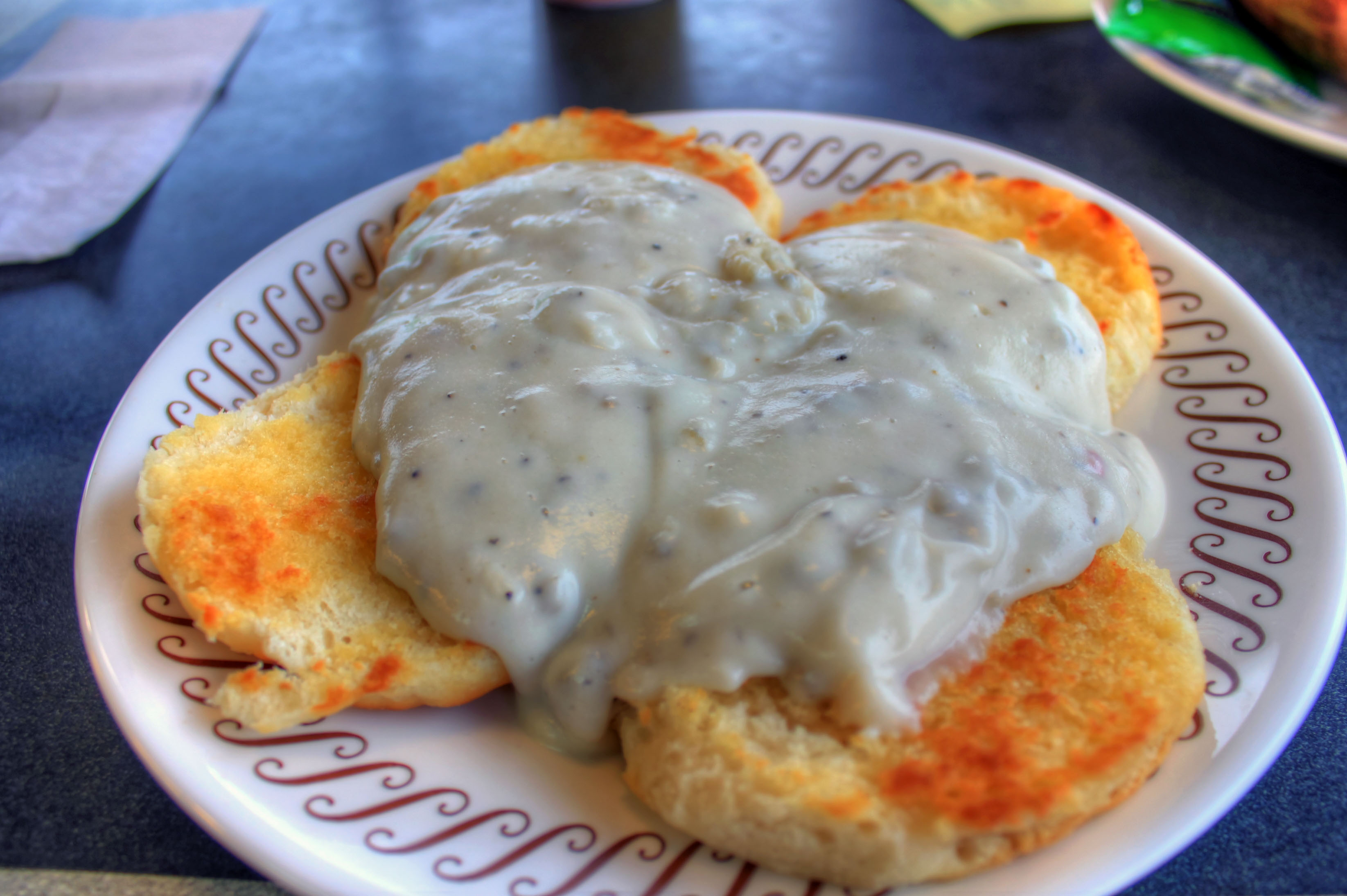
Biscuits and gravy

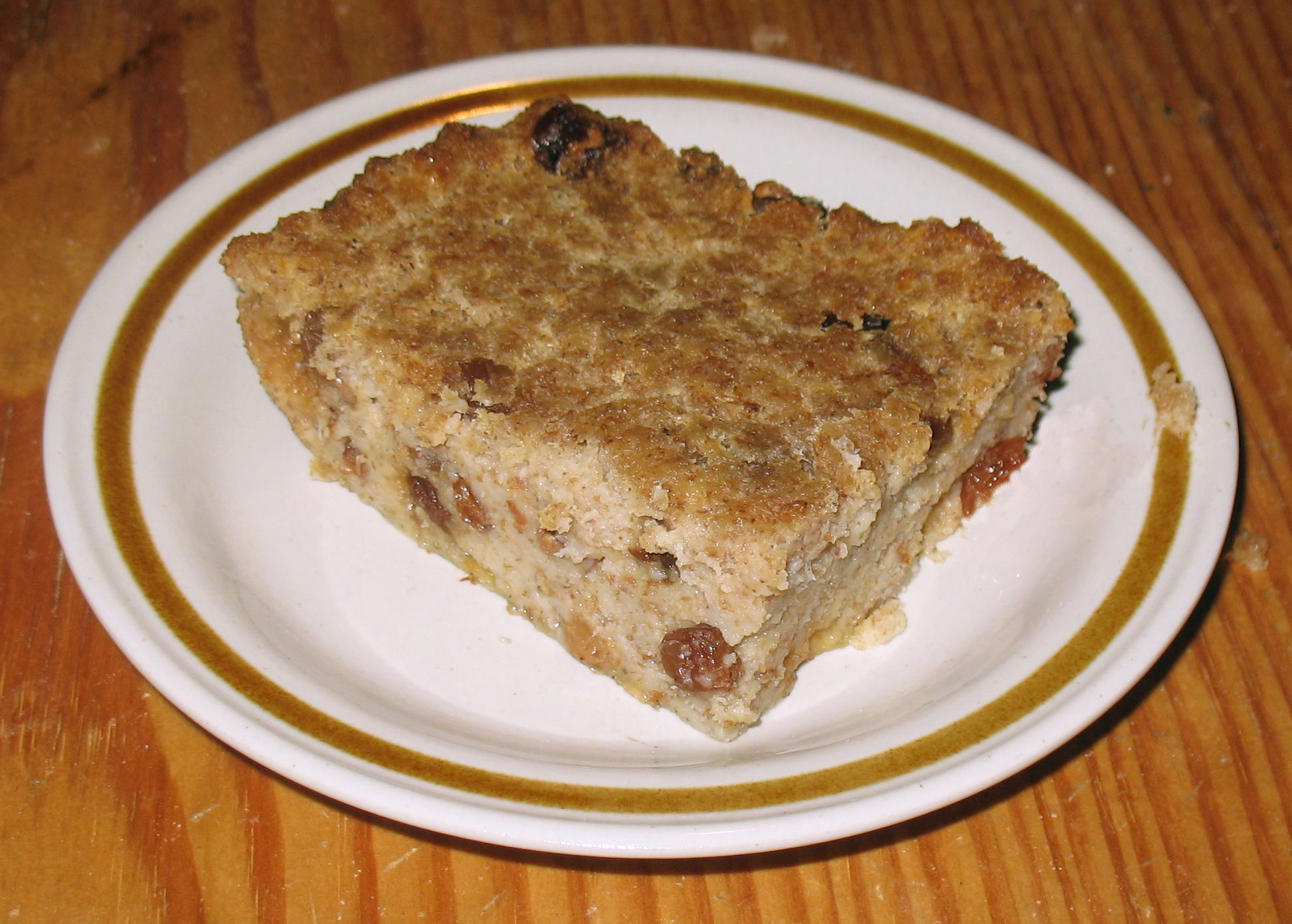
Bread pudding

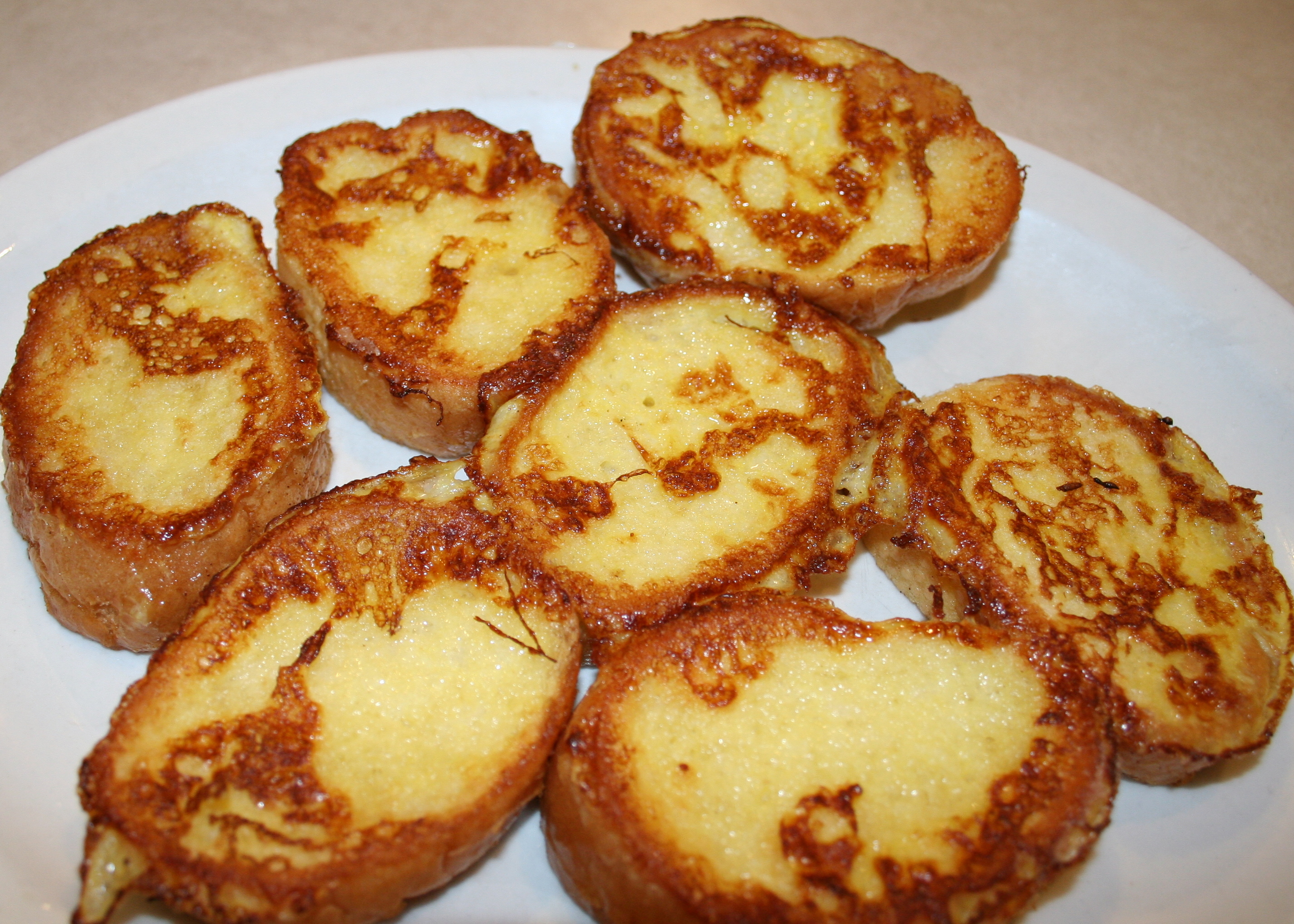
French toast

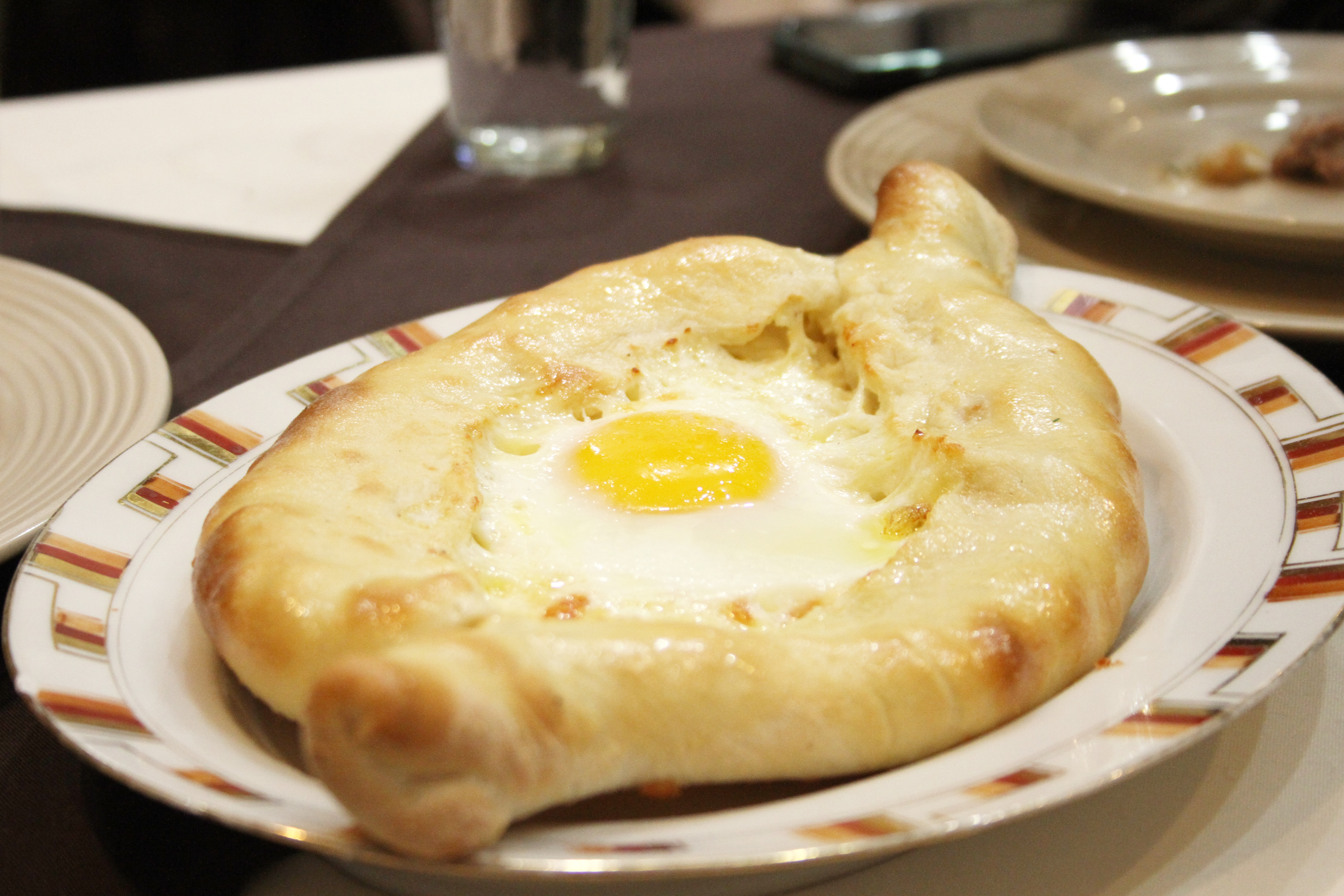
Khachapuri

- Acquasale – Southern Italian dish
- Bagel and cream cheese – Common food pairing in American cuisine
- Bibingka – Filipino baked rice cake
- Biscuits and gravy – Breakfast dish in the United States
- Biskotso – Twice-baked bread in the Philippines
- Bread and butter pudding – Traditional sweet British pudding
- Bread bowl
- Brown bread ice cream – Flavour of ice cream
- Bread dumpling – Food that consists of small pieces of dough
- Bread pudding – British Pudding made with stale bread
- Bread sauce – Sauce made with milk and bread crumbs
- Bruschetta – Italian appetizer
- Bunny chow – South African curry dish
- Croquette – Small breaded, deep-fried food
- Crouton – Rebaked bread used as topping
- Double ka meetha – Indian bread pudding
- Egg in the basket – Egg fried in a hole in a slice of bread
- Fairy bread – Children's party food
- Fit-fit – Ethiopian and Eritrean dish
- Flummadiddle – Bread pudding from New England
- Fondue – Swiss melted cheese dish
- French toast – Dish of fried bread and eggs
- Fritter – Deep-fried sweet or savoury snack
- Hushpuppy – Deep-fried savory food made from cornmeal batter
- Khachapuri – Georgian cheese-filled bread
- Kirschenmichel – German dessert
- Kubdari – Georgian dish
- Migas – Spanish and Portuguese dish
- Pigs in a blanket – Sausage wrapped in pastry
- Pizza bagel – Bagel with pizza toppings
- Popara – Sweet dish made with old bread
- Potato filling – Pennsylvania Dutch recipe
- Sandwich – Food made with bread and other ingredients
- Sandwich loaf – North American dish
- Sausage bread – American savory dish
- Sausage bun – Sausage wrapped in pastry
- Scone – Baked goods
- Skordalia – Thick garlic sauce in Greek cuisine
- Smörgåstårta – Savory cake of Swedish origin
- Sooji toast – Indian snack food
- Sop – Bread soaked in liquid and eaten
- Spoonbread – Cornmeal pudding from the Southern United States
- Strata (food) – American egg dish
- Stuffing – Edible mixture filling a food's cavity
- Tarte flambée – Savory tart from Alsace and Germany
- Toast – Bread that has been exposed to dry heat
- Toast sandwich – Sandwich with toast filling
- Torrija – Dish of fried bread and eggs
- Welsh rarebit – British dish of cheese sauce on toast

=== Bread salads ===
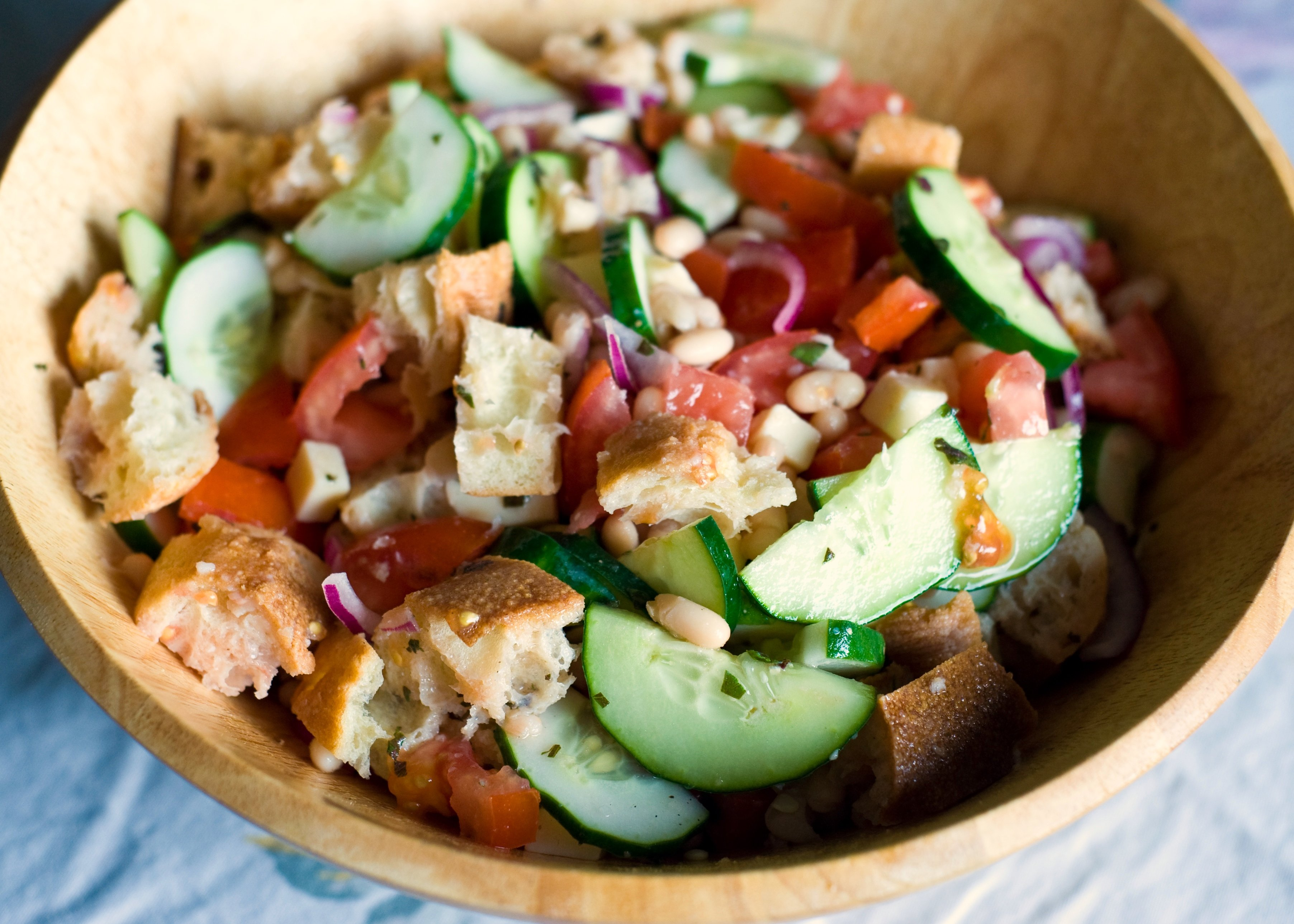
Panzanella

- Cappon magro
- Dakos
- Fattoush
- Panzanella

=== Bread soups ===
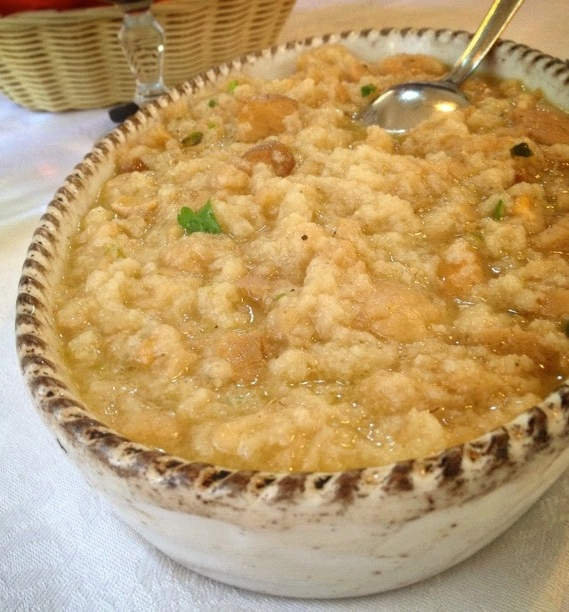
Acquacotta is a type of bread soup.

Bread soup is a simple soup that mainly consists of stale bread in a meat or vegetable broth.

- Acquacotta – Italian soup with stale bread as a primary ingredient
- Açorda – Portuguese bread soup
- Garbure – Stew in French cuisine
- Salmorejo – Traditional soup from Andalusia, Spain
- Panada – Variety of bread soup
- Paomo – Chinese traditional dish from Xi'an
- Pappa al pomodoro – Italian soup
- Ribollita, a Tuscan bread soup
- Wodzionka – Silesian and Central Poland bread soup
- Tharid, an Arab bread soup that spread to multiple other cuisines
- Tyurya – Russian cold bread soup
- Zuppa pavese – Italian soup
- Zuppa Toscana - italian soup

=== Jeon ===
Jeon refers to many pancake-like dishes in Korean cuisine.

- Bindaetteok – Korean fried mung bean pancake
- Gamjajeon – Korean potato pancake
- Hwajeon – Korean pan-fried rice cake
- Kimchijeon – Kimchi pancake
- Meat jun – Korean-Hawaiian fusion dish
- Memiljeon – Korean buckwheat pancake
- Pajeon – Korean pan-fried scallion dish
Jeon

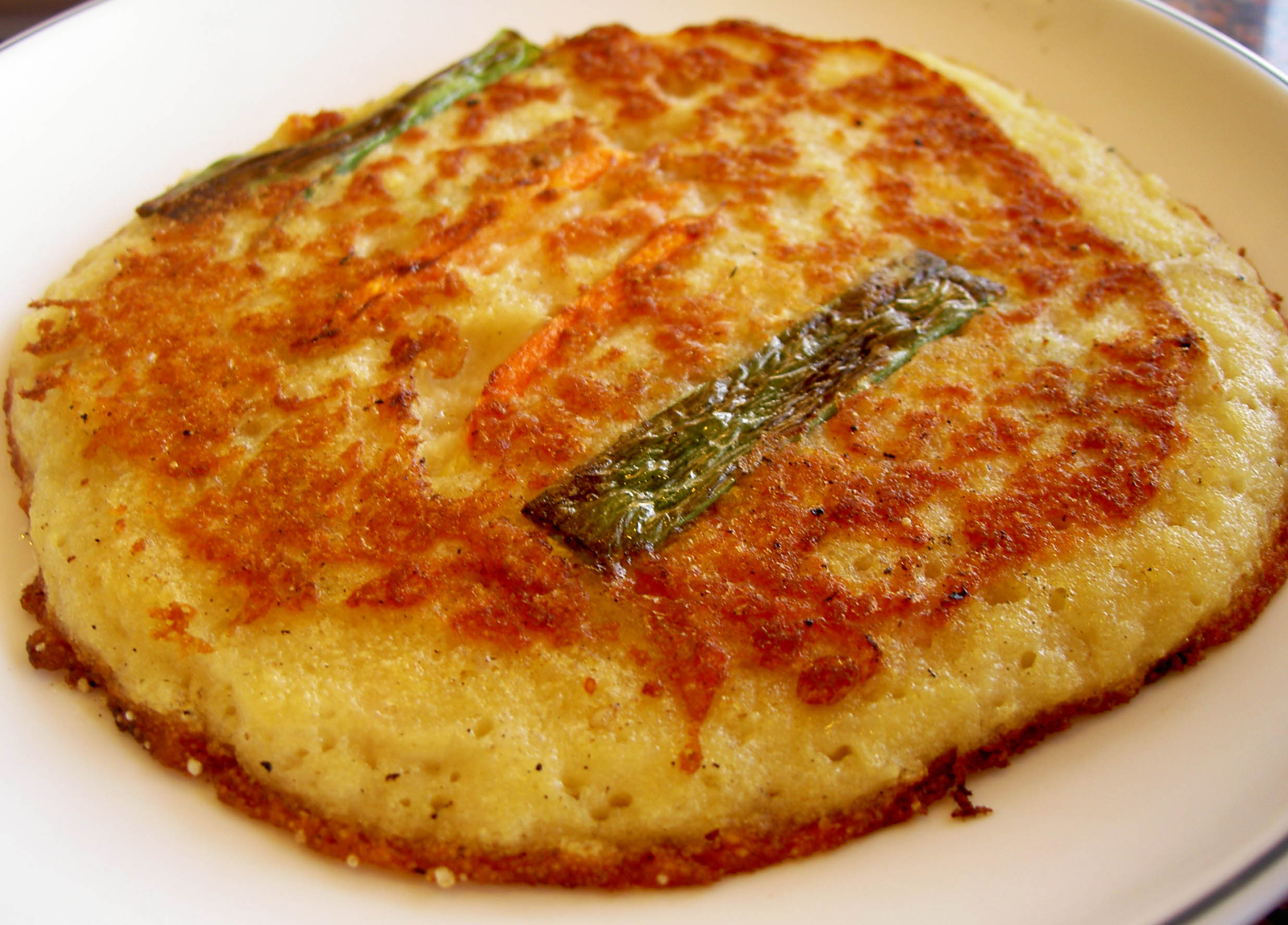
Bindaetteok

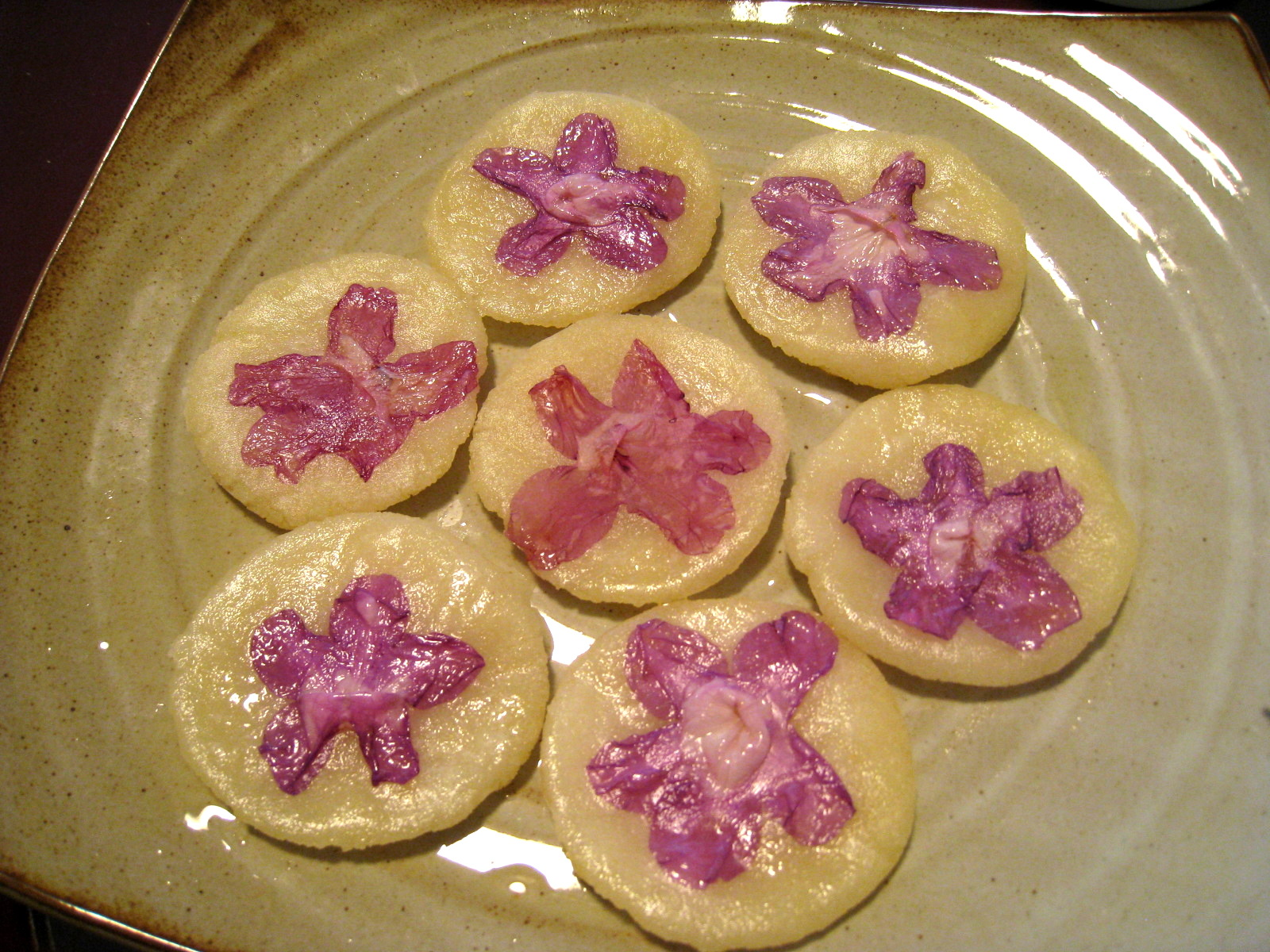
Hwajeon

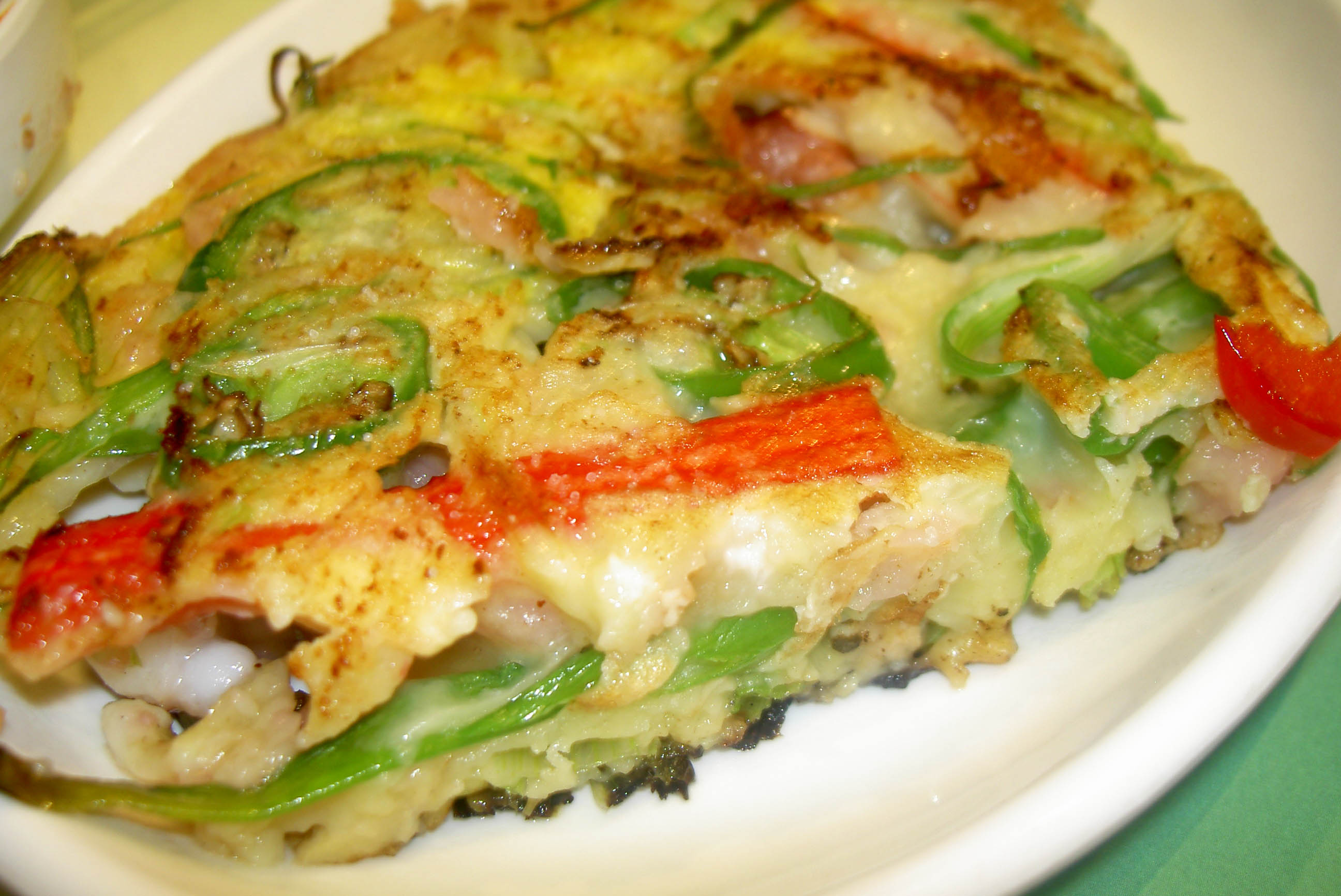
Pajeon

=== Pancakes ===
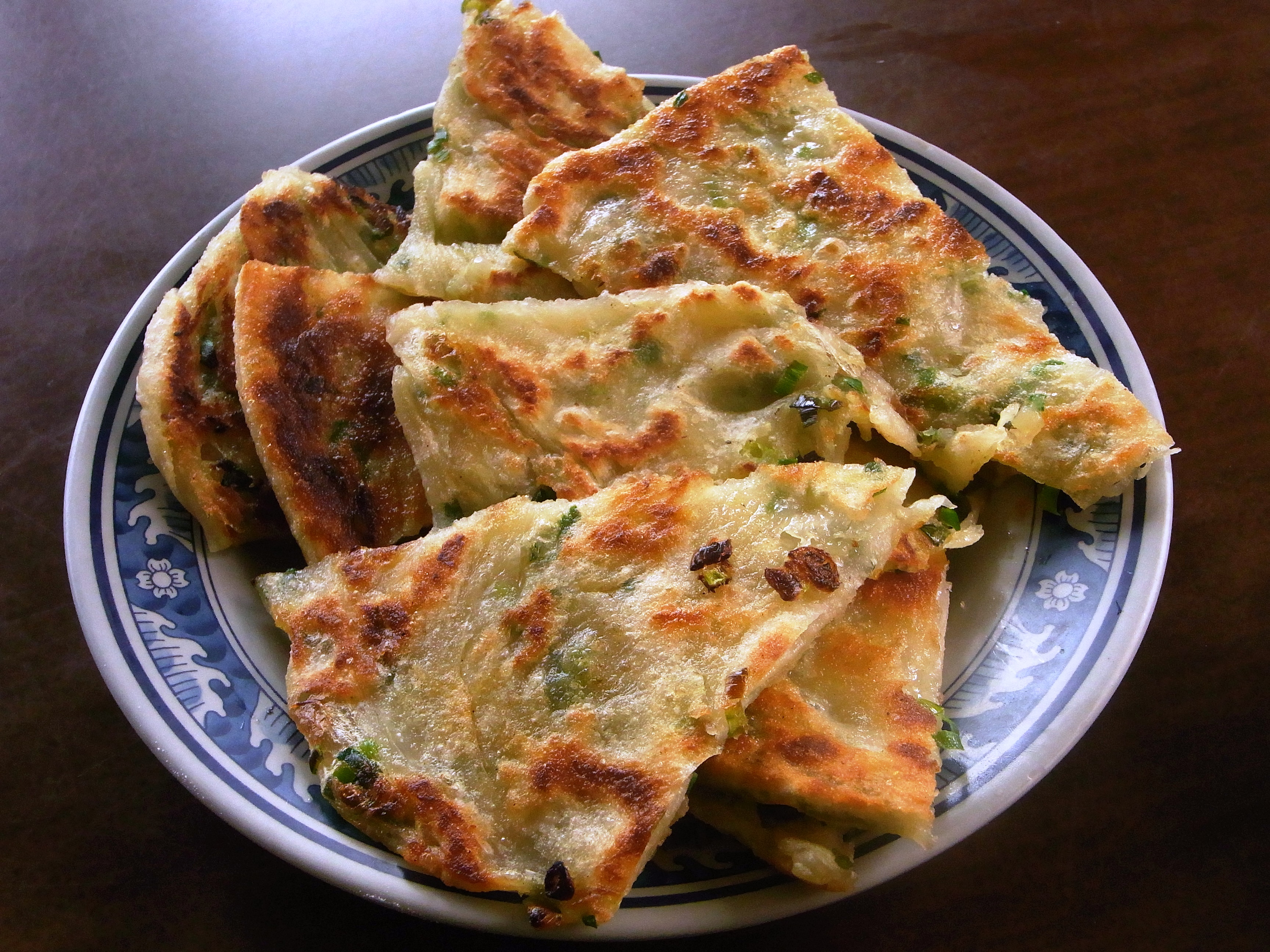
Scallion pancakes

=== Paratha ===
Paratha is a flatbread that originated in the north of the Indian subcontinent.

- Aloo paratha – Flatbread from South Asia
- Chili parotha – Flatbread from South Asia
- Gobhi paratha – Flatbread from South Asia

=== Tableware ===
- Trencher – type of tableware, commonly used in medieval cuisine; originally a flat round of bread used as a plate, upon which the food could be placed before being eaten

== See also ==
- Bread crumbs
- List of breads
- List of bread rolls
- List of buns
- Lists of prepared foods
- List of quick breads
- Rusk
