= Tilslørte bondepiker =

Scandinavian dessert

Tilslørte bondepiker / bondepige med slør
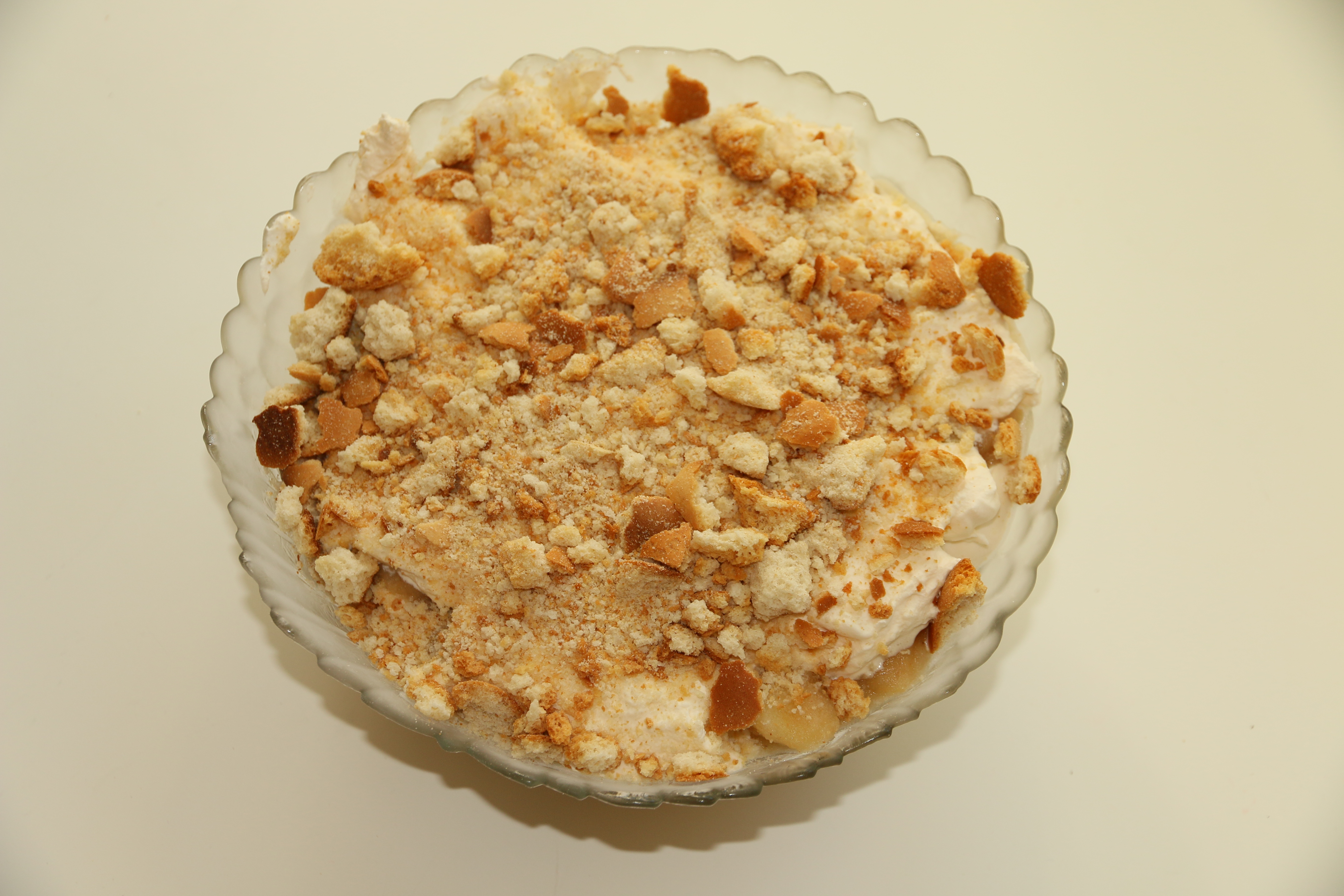
- Änglamat / Tilslørte bondepiker Bondepige med slør
- Type: Dessert
- Place of origin: Scandinavia
- Main ingredients: Mashed fruit (apples or plums), whipped cream, bread- or rusk crumbs

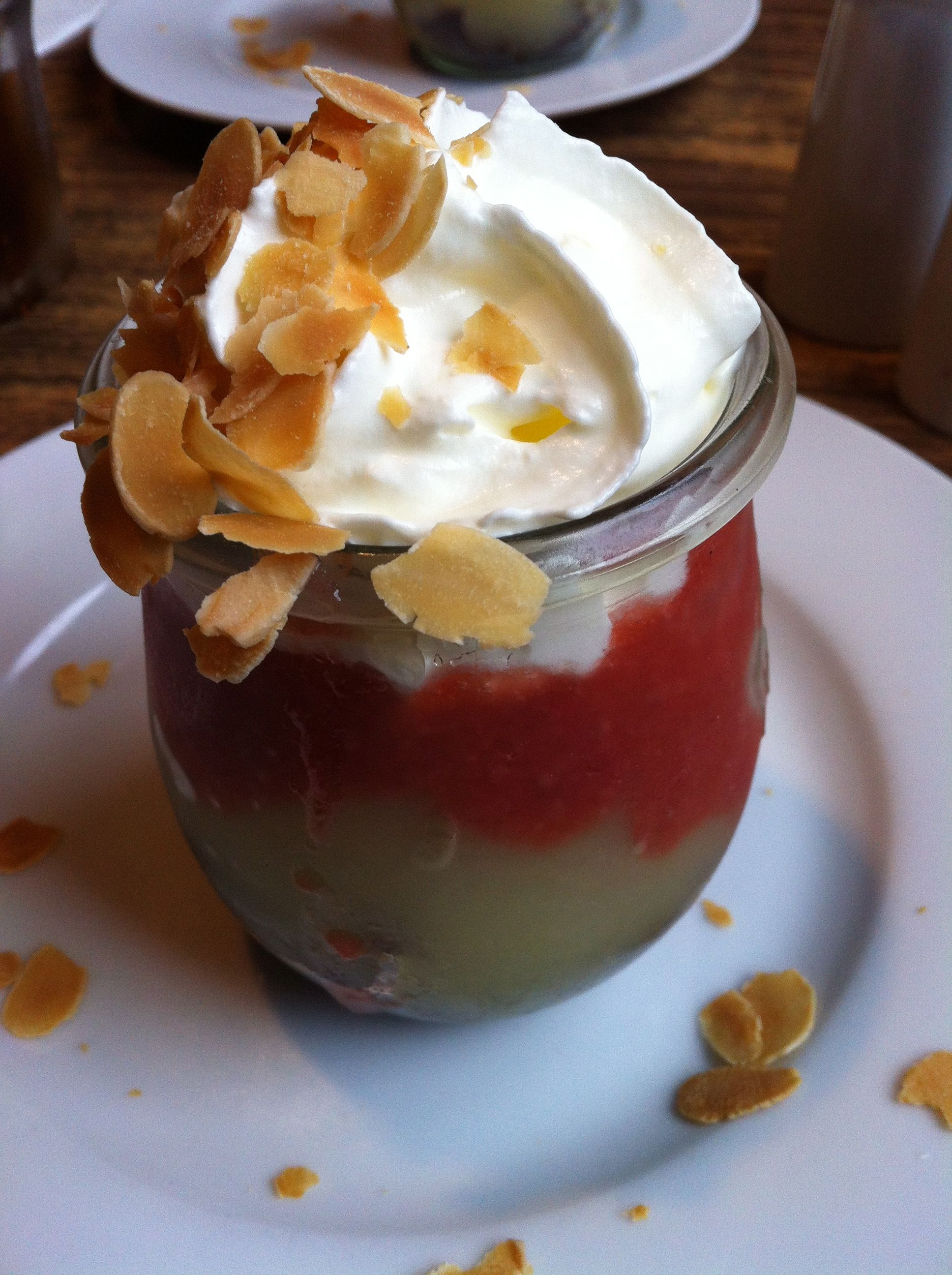
Verschleiertes Bauernmädchen served in a glass bowl

Tilslørte bondepiker (lit. veiled peasant girls. Known in Swedish as änglamat; Danish: bondepige med slør; Norwegian: tilslørte bondepiker; Finnish: pappilan hätävara; German: Verschleiertes Bauernmädchen; Low German: Buerndeern mit Sleier) is a traditional Scandinavian dessert. The dessert is available in a number of different variations. It is typically served in transparent glass or bowls.

Example of a recipe: Applesauce (or other mashed fruits) are spread out at the bottom, followed by a layer of toasted bread- or rusk crumbs, a layer of whipped cream, followed by another layer of sauce, and usually a thin layer of crumbs and or whipped cream on top. Often in multiple layers. Possible decorations also include hazelnuts or flaked almonds.

== See also ==
- List of desserts

== Related reading ==
- S. Schmidt-Nielsen, Mat-leksikon: en oppslagsbok for mat og drikkevarer. Trondheim 1947 (In Norwegian)
