= Farley's =

British food manufacturing company

Farley's Rusks
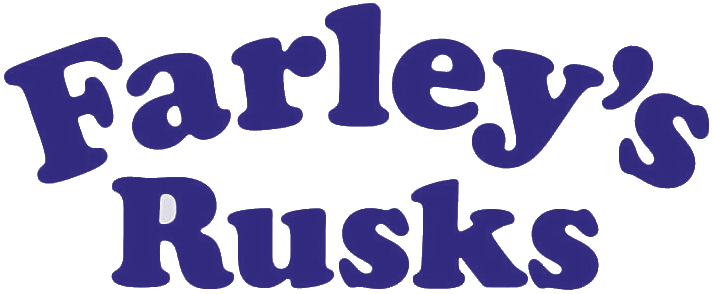
- Product type: Rusk
- Current owner: Kraft Heinz
- Produced by: Heinz
- Country: U.K.
- Introduced: 1880s

Farley's was a British food manufacturing company, best known for the baby product Farley's Rusks but also for baby rice, cereals and breadsticks. The brand mascot was a teddy bear.

The brand was started in the 1880s, but the company was taken over by and merged into H. J. Heinz Company in 1994.

In the twenty-first century, Heinz Farley’s rusks have been criticized for their sugar content.

== Administrative history ==
Farley's Health Products Limited started life in 1857 as a baker's shop, run by Mr. Samuel Farley, but they were made by his wife Ann Farley, at 90 Cambridge Street, Plymouth. In 1862 he transferred premises to 7, Exeter Street and in 1912 Edwin Farley sold the business, including the secret formula for Farley's rusks to Mr William Bolitho Trahair, prior to emigrating to Canada. William Trahair, a well-known Liberal, and Methodist lay-preacher marketed proprietary lines, such as Globe Metal Polish and John Master's matches, from his shop Globe Stores, 58-59 Notte Street, Plymouth.

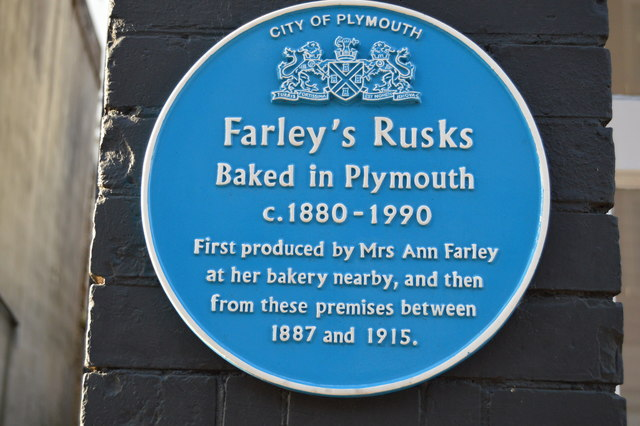
Commemorative plaque at the factory site in Plymouth.

In 1915 Trahair moved the Exeter Street bakery to 14 Notte Street and in 1919 the Trahair family formed Farley's Infant Food Limited. During the 1920s, the business transferred to Woolster Street and gave up its agencies to concentrate on rusk production.

A new model factory was built in 1931 at Torr Lane, Peverell, Plymouth. It operated throughout World War II, despite bombing in the area.

The company expanded rapidly, until the Glaxo Group took over operations in 1968. In 1986 Boots The Chemist Limited bought the Farley's interest from Glaxo. Operations continued at the Torr Lane site until the factory shut in 1990. It is now the site of a supermarket.

The company was taken over by and merged into H. J. Heinz Company in 1994 in a deal valued at £94 million.
