= Potato filling =

Pennsylvania Dutch recipe

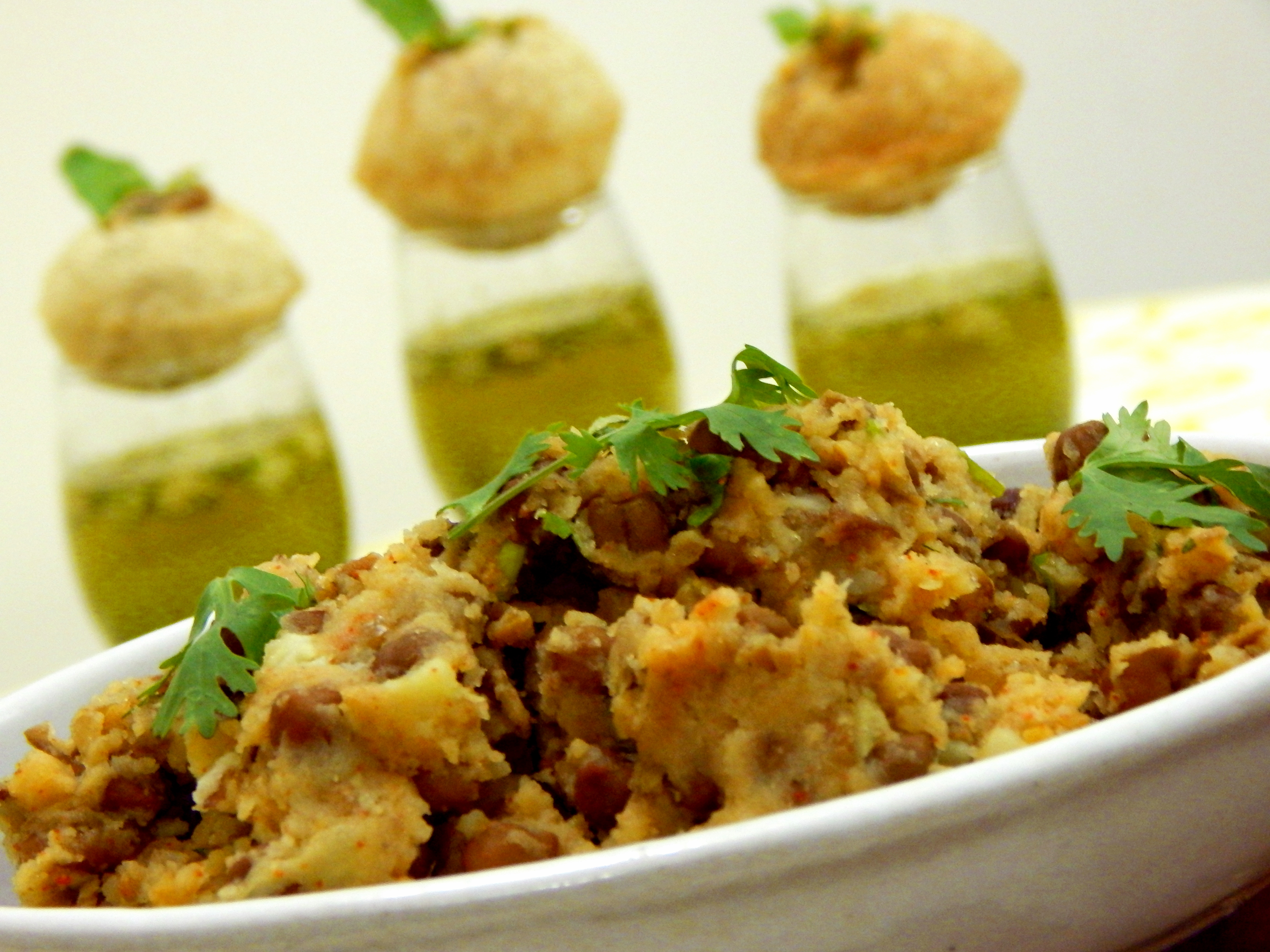
An example of potato filling

Potato filling is a Pennsylvania Dutch recipe combining mashed potatoes and bread, and either used as a stuffing or cooked separately as a casserole, sometimes in a pig stomach. Other ingredients used in its preparation may include butter, onion, parsley, eggs, milk, salt and pepper.

== History ==
Potato filling has been served for centuries in areas of Pennsylvania, such as in Berks County.

== See also ==
- List of bread dishes
- List of potato dishes
