= Paxamus =

Ancient Greek author

Paxamus, or Paxamos (Greek: Πάξαμος), was an ancient Greek author from the Hellenistic period. He composed a cookbook titled On Cooking and an agricultural textbook titled On Farming. Athenaeus, another Greek writer, mentioned Paxamus once in his work titled Deipnosophists. Paxamus was perhaps the inventor of barley biscuits named after him called "paximathia". He was quoted in the Geoponica, a Byzantine text on agriculture.
