= Rusk =

Hard, dry biscuit

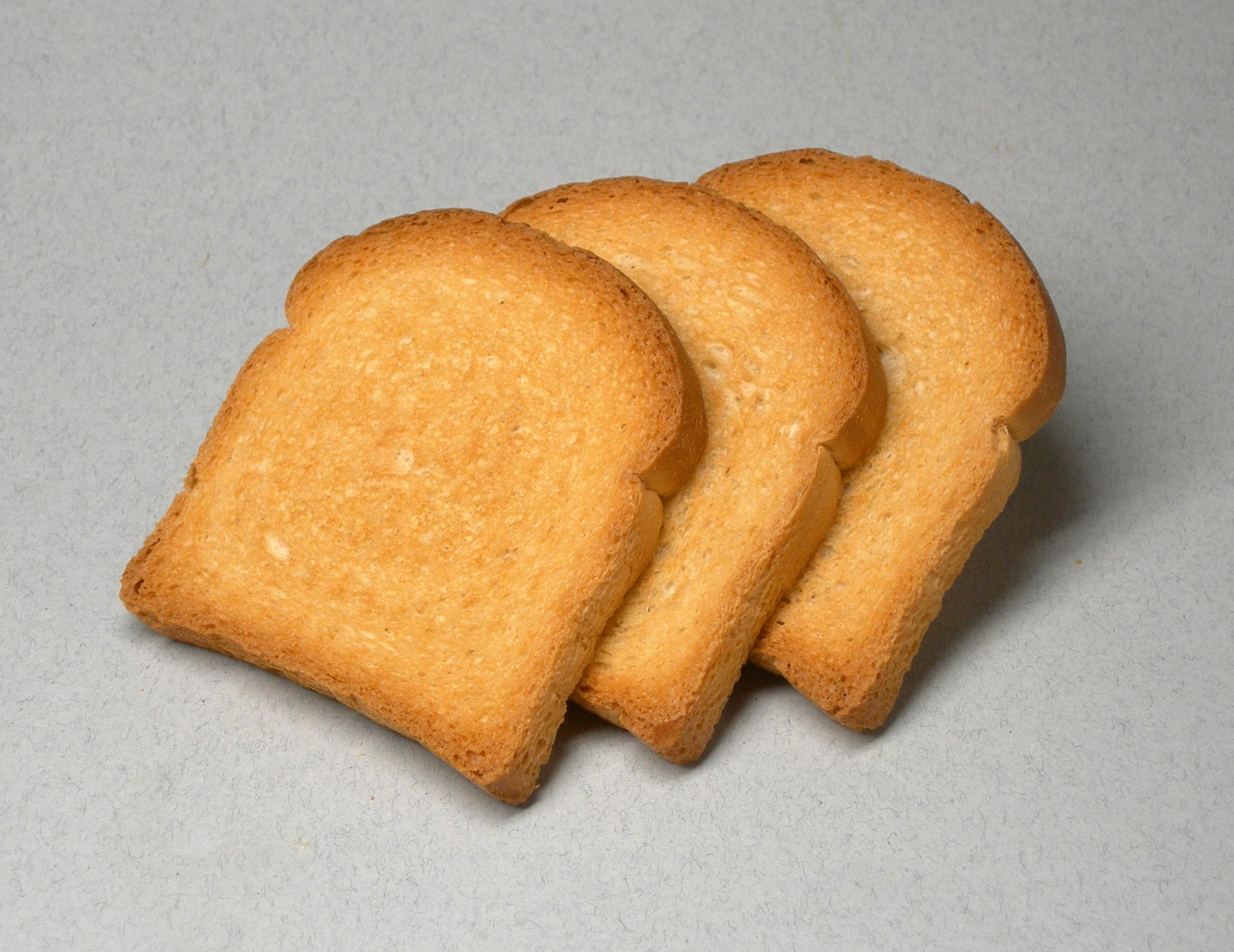
- German Zwieback
- Type: Biscuit

A rusk is a hard, dry biscuit or a twice-baked bread. It is sometimes used as a teether for babies. In some cultures, rusk is made of cake rather than bread: this is sometimes referred to as cake rusk. In the UK, the name also refers to a wheat-based food additive.

== International variations ==
=== Argentina ===
In Argentina, rusk is called tostadas de mesa (literally 'table toasts'), slices of twice-baked bread generally available in supermarkets in plain and sweetened variants. Cake rusk is called "bay biscuit"; its ingredients are egg, sugar, oil, self-rising flour, and vanilla.

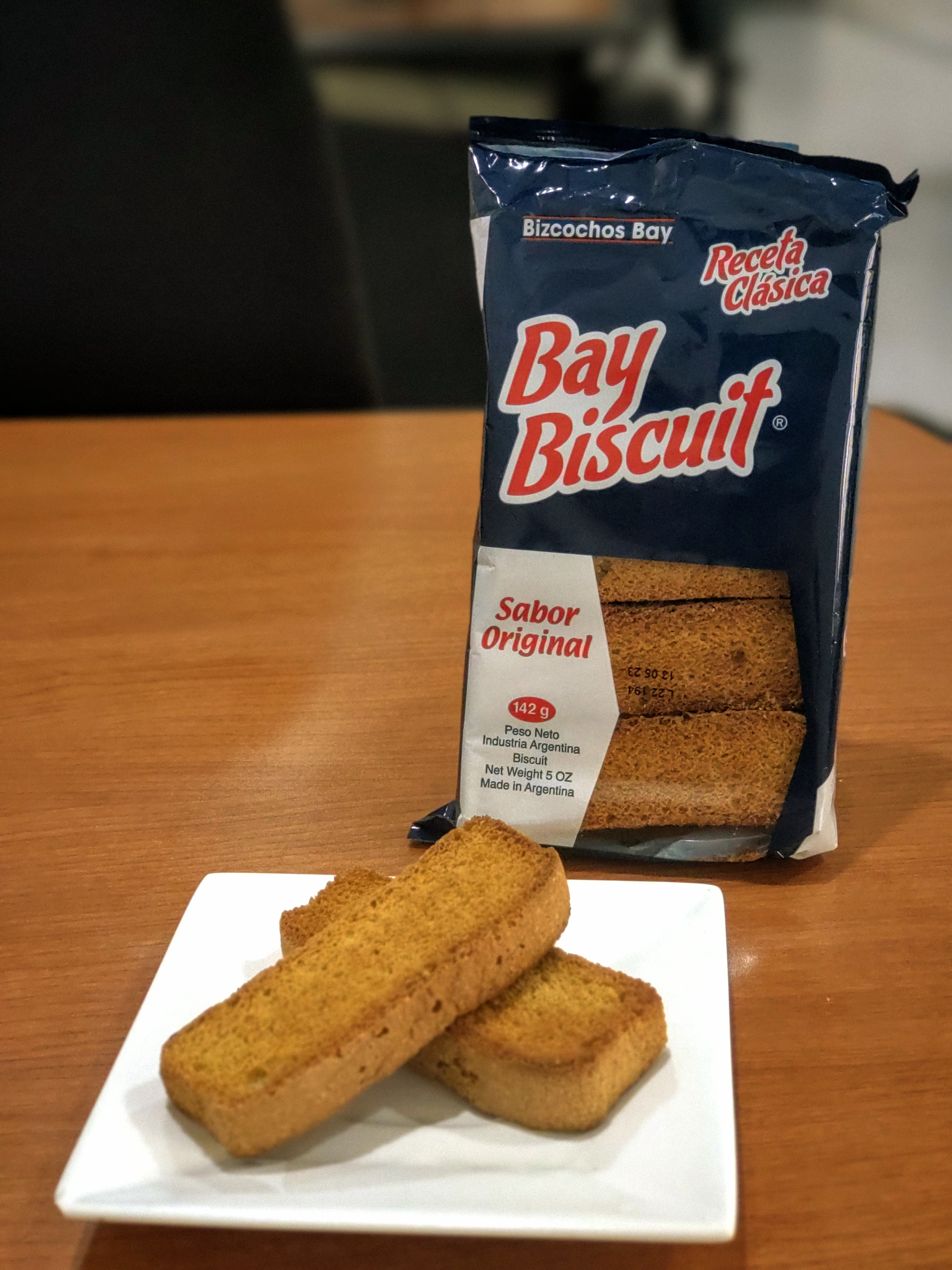
Bay biscuit

=== Azerbaijan ===
Rusk is called sukhary (Azerbaijani: suxarı – a loanword from Russian via Persian) in Azerbaijani. It is usually made from stale bread and buns. In Baku, some bakeries use their stale buns and bread for making rusks. The price of rusk in those bakeries is usually low, as the bakeries do this to avoid wasting the leftover bread and buns.

=== Balkans ===
The Serbo-Croatian version is called dvopek (dvo- 'twice', pek, 'baked').

=== Bangladesh ===
Rusk is commonly called toast biscuit. Toast biscuits come in a variety of flavours, such as ghee toast, garlic toast, and sugar toast, and are usually served with tea. Cake rusk is commonly known as dry cake.

=== Brazil ===
The Brazilian version of rusks is called torrada industrializada (industrialised toast), or simply torrada (toast). As of 2016 it was consumed by 33.2% of Brazilian households.

=== Britain ===
Butcher rusk is a dry biscuit broken into particles, sorted by particle size and sold to butchers and others for use as a food additive in sausage manufacture. Though originally made from stale bread, now called "bread-rusk", a yeast-free variety called simply "rusk" is now more commonly used.

Various rusk particle sizes are used in the food industry, where uses include:

- A carrier for flavours, colours and seasonings
- A binding agent in hamburgers, sausages, stuffings, pies, and other compound meat products
- An ingredient for dried stuffing mixes

==== Farley's Rusks ====
In the UK, Farley's Rusks are a dry teething biscuit dating from the 1880s, but manufactured by Heinz since 1994. They are usually given to infants, either soaked in milk and mashed up or in their original hard form as a teething aid.

=== Cuba ===
Sponge rusk (Cuban Spanish: esponru) is similar to biscotti but it is made out of twice-baked yellow cake batter. The yellow cake batter is baked in a flat, rectangular cake pan. After it is baked and cooled, it is sliced into strips and baked again or toasted to make cake toast. It is usually eaten with café cubano (Cuban espresso) or as an accompaniment to ice cream, custard, or other dessert dishes.

=== Denmark ===
Tvebak is derived from Dutch tweebak (literally 'two bake'), an archaic synonym of beschuit.

=== France ===
A biscotte is a French type of rusk. They are sold packaged in supermarkets. They are typically consumed for breakfast with butter, jam, or both.

=== Finland ===
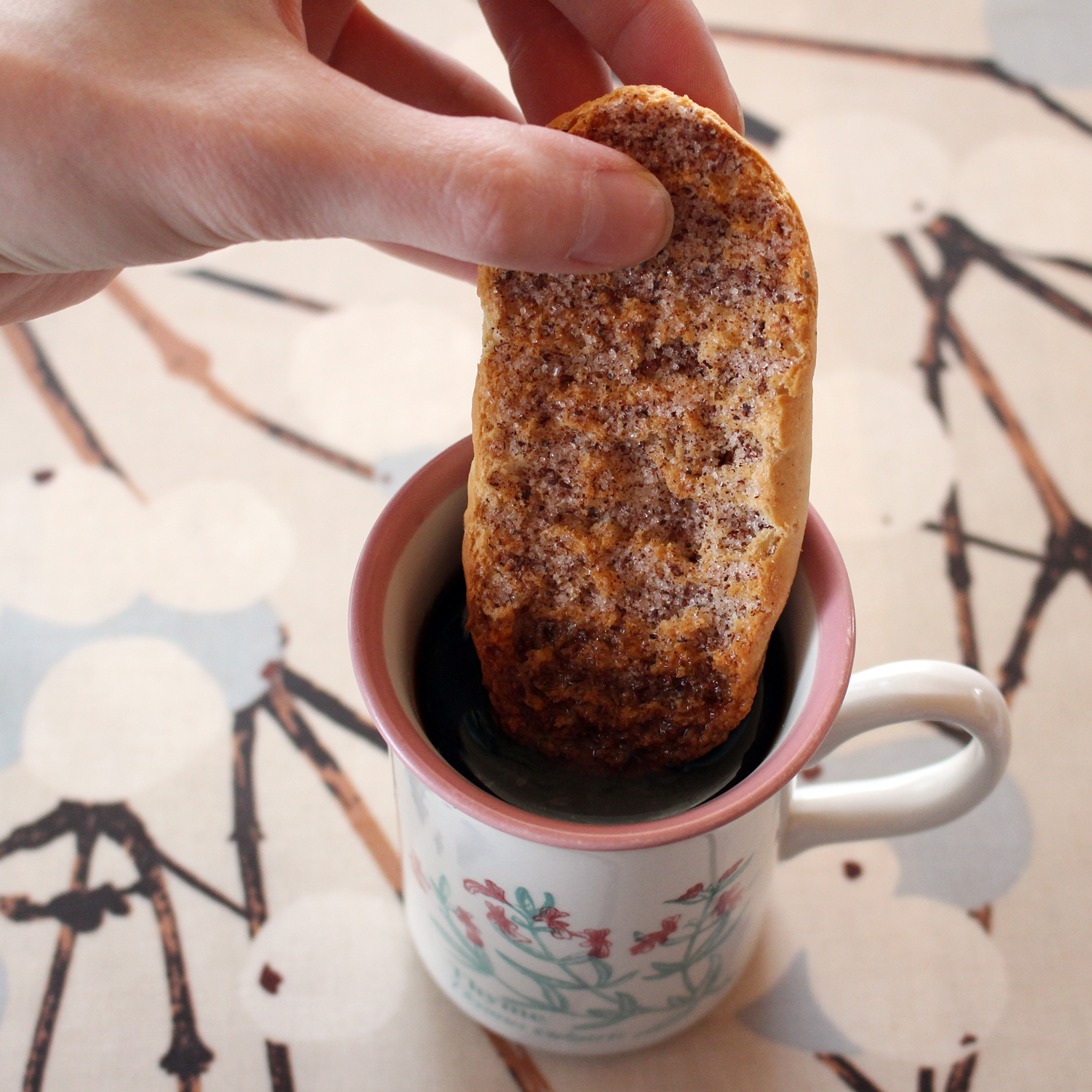
Dipping a Finnish cinnamon and sugar flavored korppu in coffee

A Finnish type of rusk is called korppu, usually a dried piece of bun, flavoured with cinnamon or sugar. Korppu is a common coffee bread, normally eaten after having been dipped in coffee. A sour version, called hapankorppu, is a flat rusk made from rye flour and salt, and can be eaten like crispbread.

=== Germany ===
Zwieback (literally 'twice baked') is a form of rusk in Germany. Like the Danish and French words, the name refers to being baked or cooked twice.

=== Greece ===
The term paximadi (Greek: παξιμάδι) covers various forms of Greek rusk, commonly made from barley or chickpea flour, and softened with wine, water, or oil before eating. Paximadi form the basis of the Cretan snack dakos (Greek: ντάκος).

=== India ===
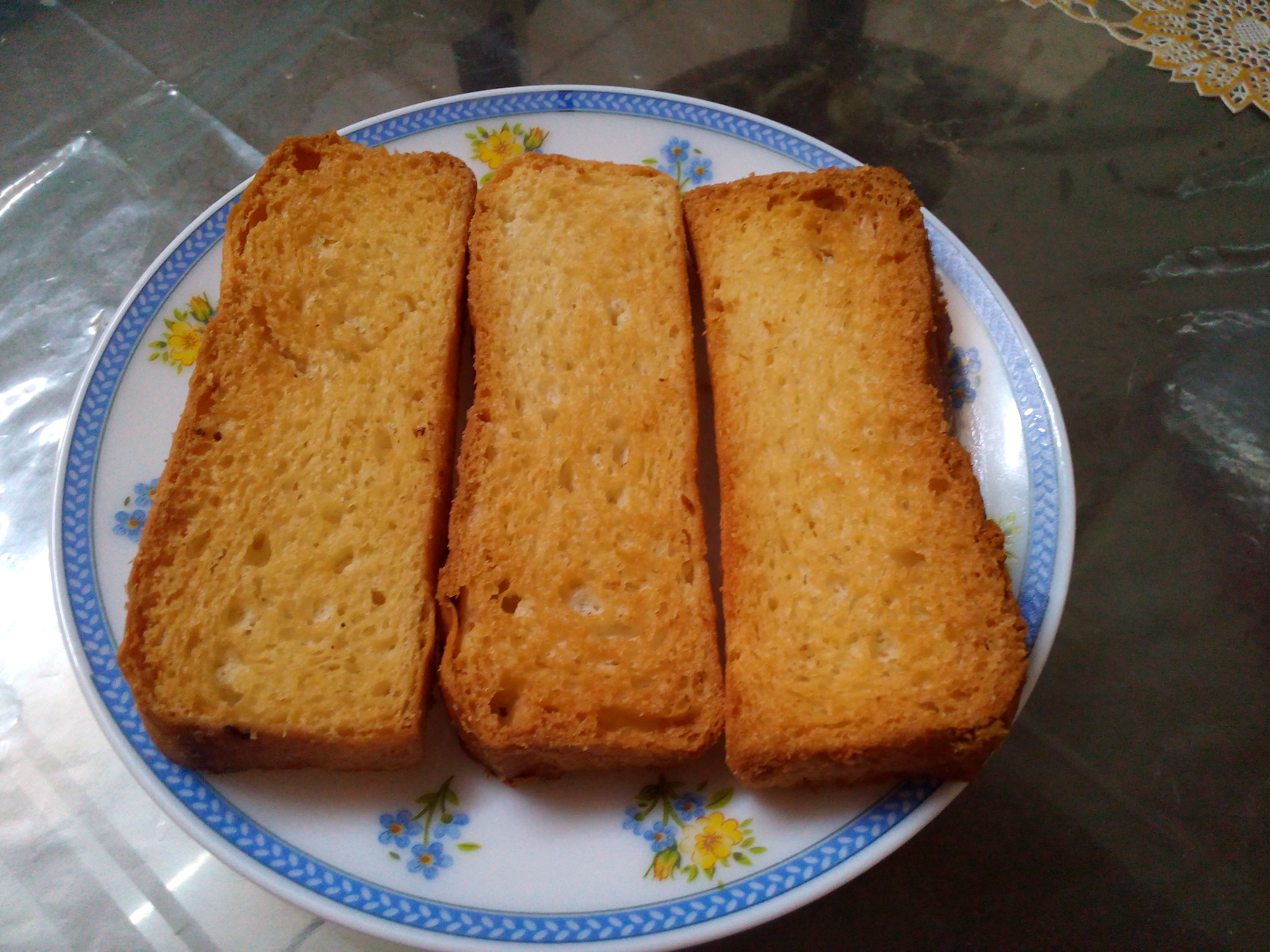
Rusks from India

In India rusk (sometimes also called toast biscuit) is a traditional dried bread or cake. It is also known as papay, rattan, khasta (Hindi: ख़स्ता), russ or cake rusk in Hindi-Urdu and Punjabi; porai (பொறை) in Tamil; or kathi biskut in Bengali. It is usually eaten dipped in milk tea, which softens the rusk. The sweet "cake rusk" version is made of cake whose ingredients include wheat flour, sugar, fat, leavening agent, and, optionally, eggs. A common variant is flavoured with cardamom.

=== Indonesia ===
Double-baked bread in Indonesia is called bagelen, believed to originate from Bagelen, a village in Central Java. Before the second baking, the bread is smeared with sugar and buttercream. It is usually eaten as a snack.

=== Iran ===
In Iran, rusk is called nān-e sokhāri (Persian: نان سوخاری). It is made from wheat flour, sugar, skimmed milk powder, vegetable oil, gluten, malt extract, soy flour, salt, yeast, and water. It is eaten as a dunking biscuit, particularly with Persian chai (tea). The most common brand of naan sukhaari is Vitana.

=== Italy ===
In Italy, rusk is called fette biscottate (twice-baked slices). It should not be confused with biscotti (sweet cookies or biscuits).

=== Japan ===
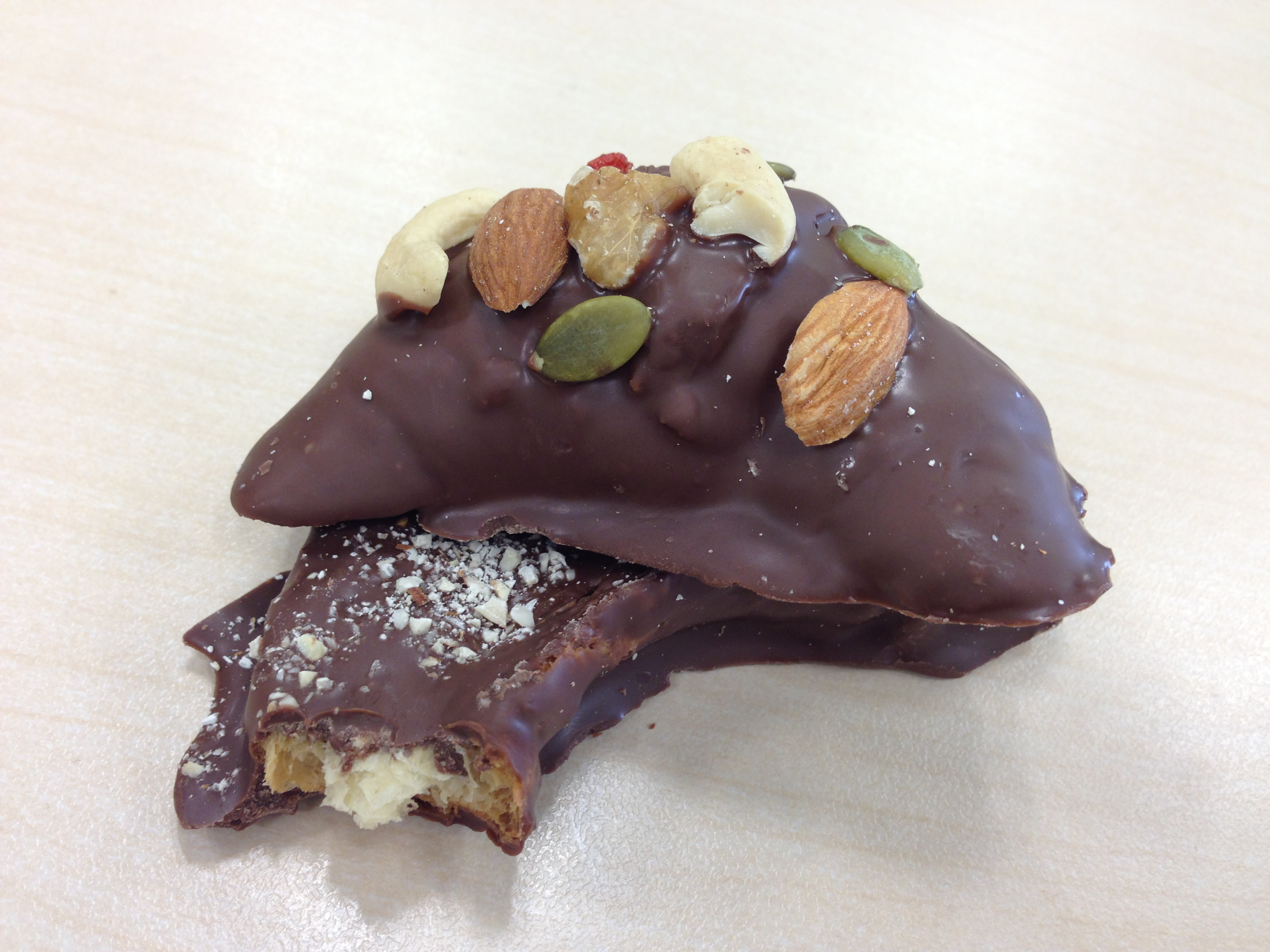
Croissant rusk covered with chocolate and nuts, Japan

Rusk is very common in Japan, found in many bakeries throughout the country as well as shops specializing in rusks. Though it is commonly made from shokupan crusts, often sugared or buttered, it may also be made from baguette, croissant, or cake.

=== The Levant ===
In the Levant this form is called boksum (Arabic: بقصم) in Iraq and Syria or qurshalla (Arabic: قرشلة) in Jordan. It is made from flour, eggs, oil or butter, sugar, yeast or baking powder, and sometimes a small amount of cardamon. It is topped with roasted sesame seeds, black caraway seeds, or anise, and eaten as a dunking biscuit, especially with herbal tea.

=== Netherlands and Belgium (Flanders) ===
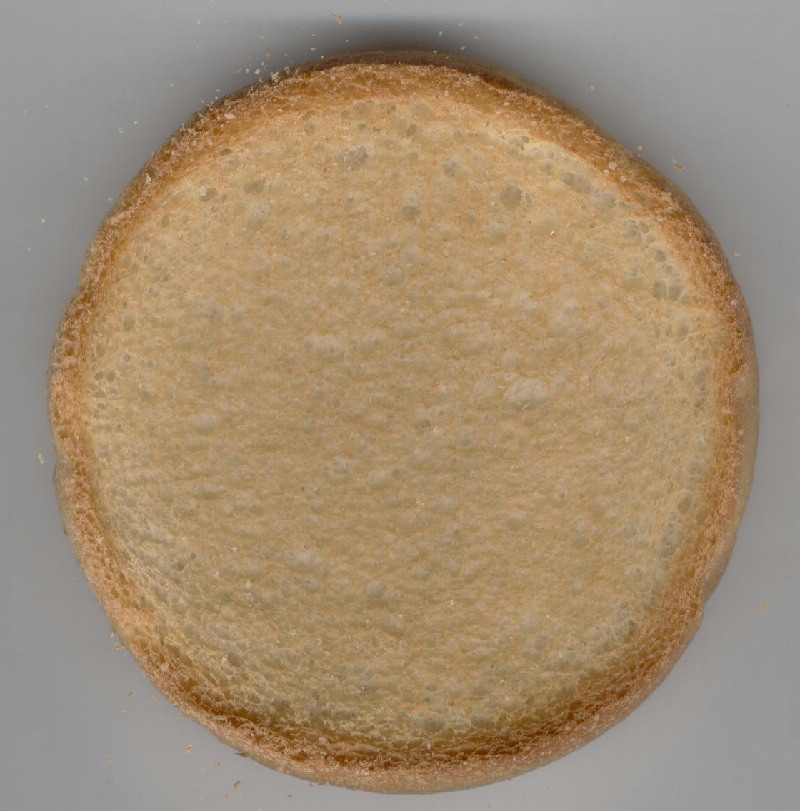
Dutch-style beschuit

Beschuit, also known as Dutch crispbakes, are light, round, rather crumbly, unsweetened rusks as eaten in the Netherlands and Belgium. When a baby is born in the Netherlands, it is customary to serve beschuit met muisjes (with 'little mice', which are aniseeds covered in a white and pink or blue sugar layer, depending on the newborn's sex). Beschuit are also eaten as a breakfast food with a variety of toppings, most commonly butter and sprinkles in flavours such as chocolate (chocoladehagel or chocoladevlokken) or fruit (vruchtenhagel), jam or cheese. A longtime Dutch favourite is to serve strawberries on beschuit, which is usually topped with sugar or whipped cream.

Beschuiten are made by first baking a flat round bread (beschuitbol), slicing it in half, and then baking each half again, usually at a lower heat. It is almost always sold in rolls; a roll typically has 13 rusks (a baker's dozen). They became popular in the 17th century, as scheepsbeschuit, a food that keeps well during long sea journeys. Etymologically, biscotto (16th-century Italian), biscuit (19th century, from 16th-century bisket) and beschuit come from the Latin phrase (panis) bis-coctus, '(bread), twice cooked'.

=== Norway ===
In Norway, rusk is referred to as kavring, and is similar to the Swedish skorpor. Crushed kavring, called strøkavring, is used, amongst other things, for making kjøttkaker and in the traditional dessert tilslørte bondepiker. Kavring is also broken up and can be served with regular, soured or cultured milk.

=== Pakistan ===
In Pakistan, rusk is colloquially known as russ (Urdu: رس). It is either available as a spherical shape that is akin to a bun or as separate rectangular pieces. It is a popular breakfast food, and is usually eaten by dipping it into milk tea, locally known as doodh chai, to soften it. It is called papay (پاپے) in Punjabi.

=== Philippines ===
The Philippine version of rusk is called biscocho. Cake rusks are called mamon tostado.

=== Portugal ===
The Portuguese version of rusk is called tosta. Tosta is a hard coarse-textured slice of bread – which can be sweet, but most often savory – and it can be of various shapes and thicknesses. It is often ground up and used as bread crumbs.

=== Russia ===
The Russian version is called sukhar' (Cyrillic: сухарь), from сухой 'dry'. They are either baked a second time from sweet challah-like bread, sliced in biscotti fashion or made of leftover stale bread, cut into small cubes and air-dried or baked at a very low temperature. The first one is like a cookie, which can be served with milk, kefir, tea, coffee or cacao. The second one is usually added to soup, clear or otherwise, softening up from absorbed liquids and accompanying it instead of bread. It became a tradition to avoid wasting leftover bread that always was a staple in Russian cuisine. There is much folklore about bread in the Russian language, paying respect to this grain food that is one of the cornerstones of Slavic nations' life and history. Rye bread rusks are the major ingredient in making of the Russian kvass, a traditional fermented beverage.

=== Slovenia ===
The Slovene version is called prepečenec, meaning 'baked over ordinary' or 'overbaked'.

=== South Africa ===
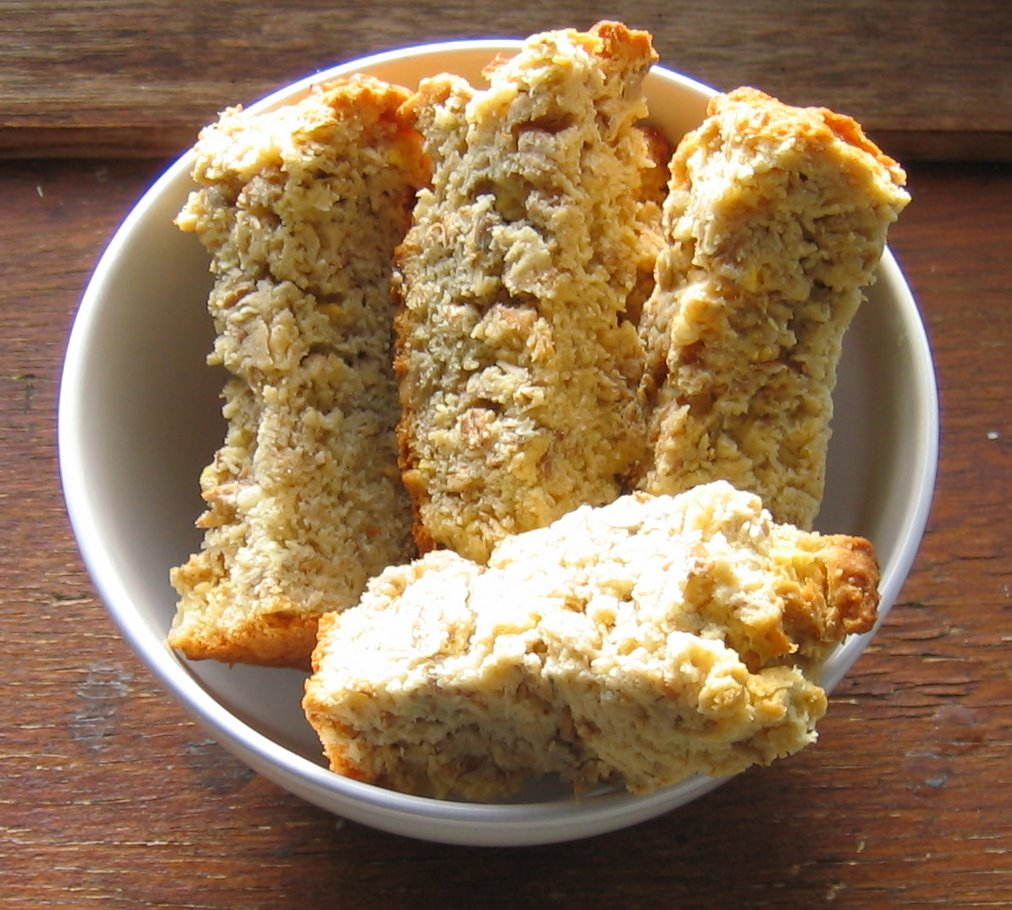
South African beskuit

==== Definition ====
Rusks is the anglicized term for beskuit and is a traditional Afrikaner breakfast meal or snack. They have been dried in South Africa since the late 1690s as a way of preserving bread, especially when traveling long distances without refrigeration. Their use continued through the Great Trek and the Boer Wars through to the modern day. Rusks are typically dunked in coffee or tea before being eaten.

==== Recipe ====
Rusks are essentially double-baked bread dough. Round balls of dough are closely packed in pans and baked like bread, after which long chunks are cut or broken off and slowly re-baked to a dry consistency. Several modern-day, mass-produced versions are available, the most famous brand being Ouma Rusks. Many bakeries, delis, and home industries sell commercial rusks, sometimes made from non-traditional ingredients, such as baking powder rather than sourdough. In addition to plain and buttermilk flavours, aniseed, whole wheat, condensed milk, muesli, and lemon poppyseed variations are also available.

=== Sweden ===
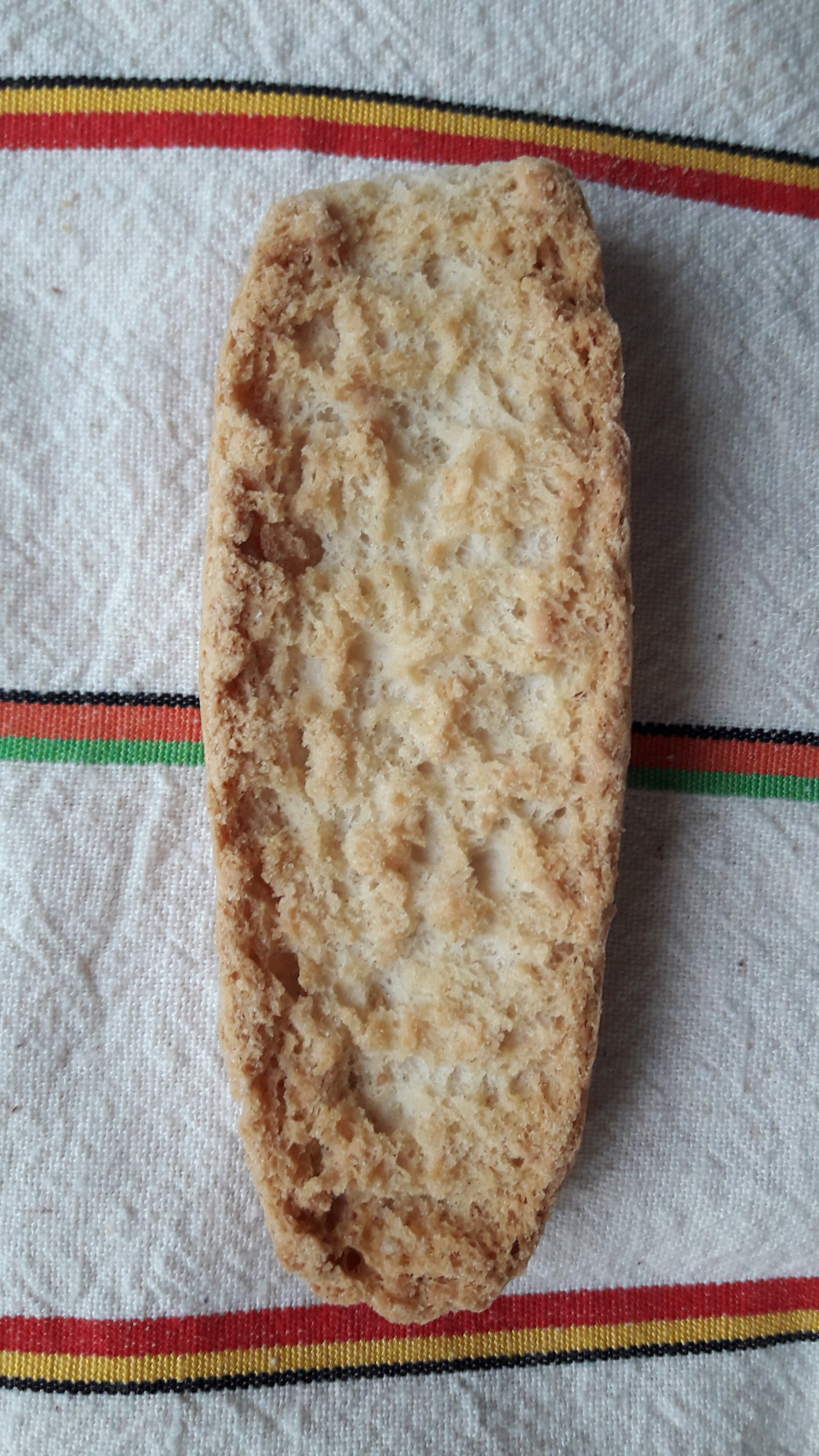
Skorpa, a Swedish rusk

Skorpor (plural; singular skorpa) are a Swedish form of rusk. They are usually unflavoured or flavoured with cardamom, but can also be flavoured with herbs, dried fruit, nuts, or spices such as anise. Swedish bakery company Pågen makes the world's most-sold rusk brand, Krisprolls. The traditional Swedish way to eat them is dipping them into a beverage such as coffee, milk or juice. Butter and possibly cheese, marmalade or jam can be added on top; they may be eaten together with a beverage or a fruit soup.

Rusks are known in Sweden at least since the 16th century. Rusks were provisions in the military units and on ships. Back then they could also be crushed with a hammer and the crumbs ended up in svagdricka, beer and soup.

=== Turkey ===
In Turkish, rusk is called peksimet. Pek means 'solid, tight, durable' in Turkish and simet/simit is an Arabic word (سميد) meaning 'bread' or 'flour'. Another name is galeta, a loanword from Catalan.

=== United States ===
In the US, commonly available types of rusk include Melba toast and croutons, which are sold packaged in grocery stores, and biscotti, which are found both at grocery stores and coffee shops.

== See also ==
- Hardtack, a type of rusk historically eaten aboard ships
- List of bread dishes
- Milk toast
