= Portokalopita =

Greek orange cake

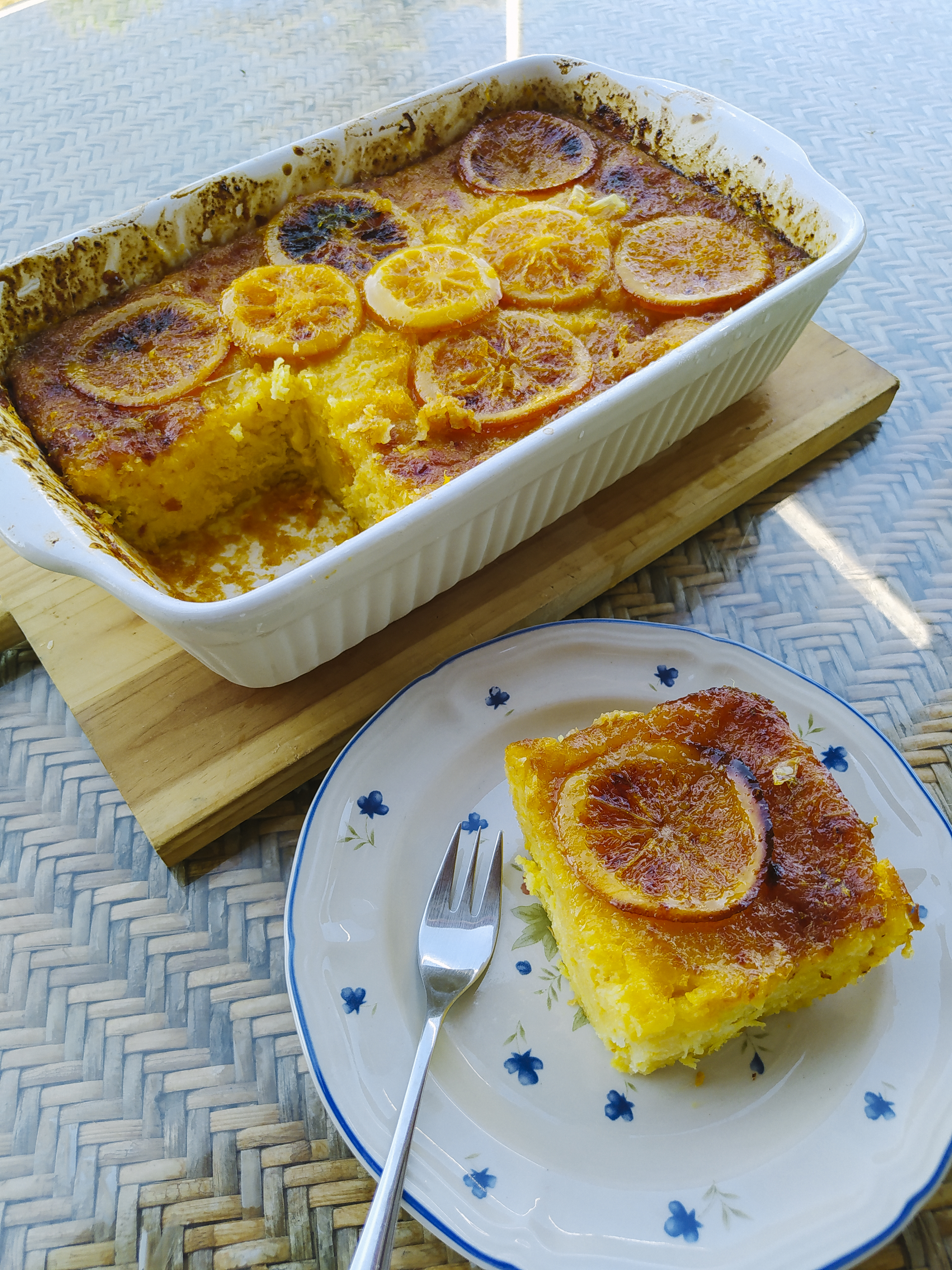
- Type: cake
- Place of origin: Greece
- Main ingredients: Phyllo dough · orange (juice and zest) · Greek yogurt · sugar · egg · baking powder or yeast · olive oil · vanilla extract · cinnamon

Portokalópita (in Greek, Πορτοκαλόπιτα; from πορτοκάλι portokáli "orange" and πιτα pita "cake") is a typical Greek cake whose main ingredient is sweet orange. Portokalópita is very popular in Greece and is usually consumed as a dessert with coffee. Within Greek pastries, it belongs to the family of cakes called siropiasta, sweets that are bathed in syrup, such as baklava. Although it has a sponge-like appearance, its dough is actually made from dry shreds of filo dough. (φύλλο phyllo), to which a mixture of Greek yogurt, egg and orange juice is added. It is bathed on top with a syrup (liquid sugar) that has been simmered with oranges and sometimes flavored with vanilla and / or cinnamon. Ideally, it is consumed the next day or the day after, when the syrup is fully absorbed and all the flavors of the cake have been integrated. The mouthfeel should be fluffy and juicy, preventing it from being compact.

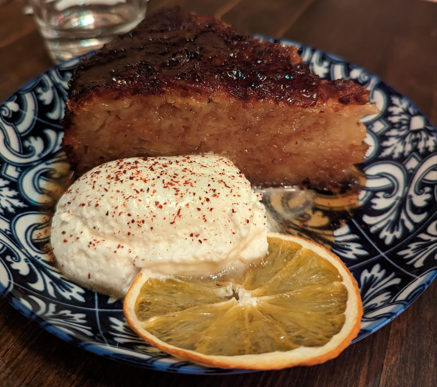
Portokalopita served with ice cream in Jerusalem

Orange is a staple ingredient of Greek cuisine and is grown in the south of the Peloponnese peninsula (especially in the areas of Laconia and Argolis) and Arta (in the north of the country) and on the island of Chios, amongst others.

== See also ==
- Galaktoboureko, another Greek filo pastry
- Patsavouropita, another Greek filo pastry
