= Paximathia =

Greek bread

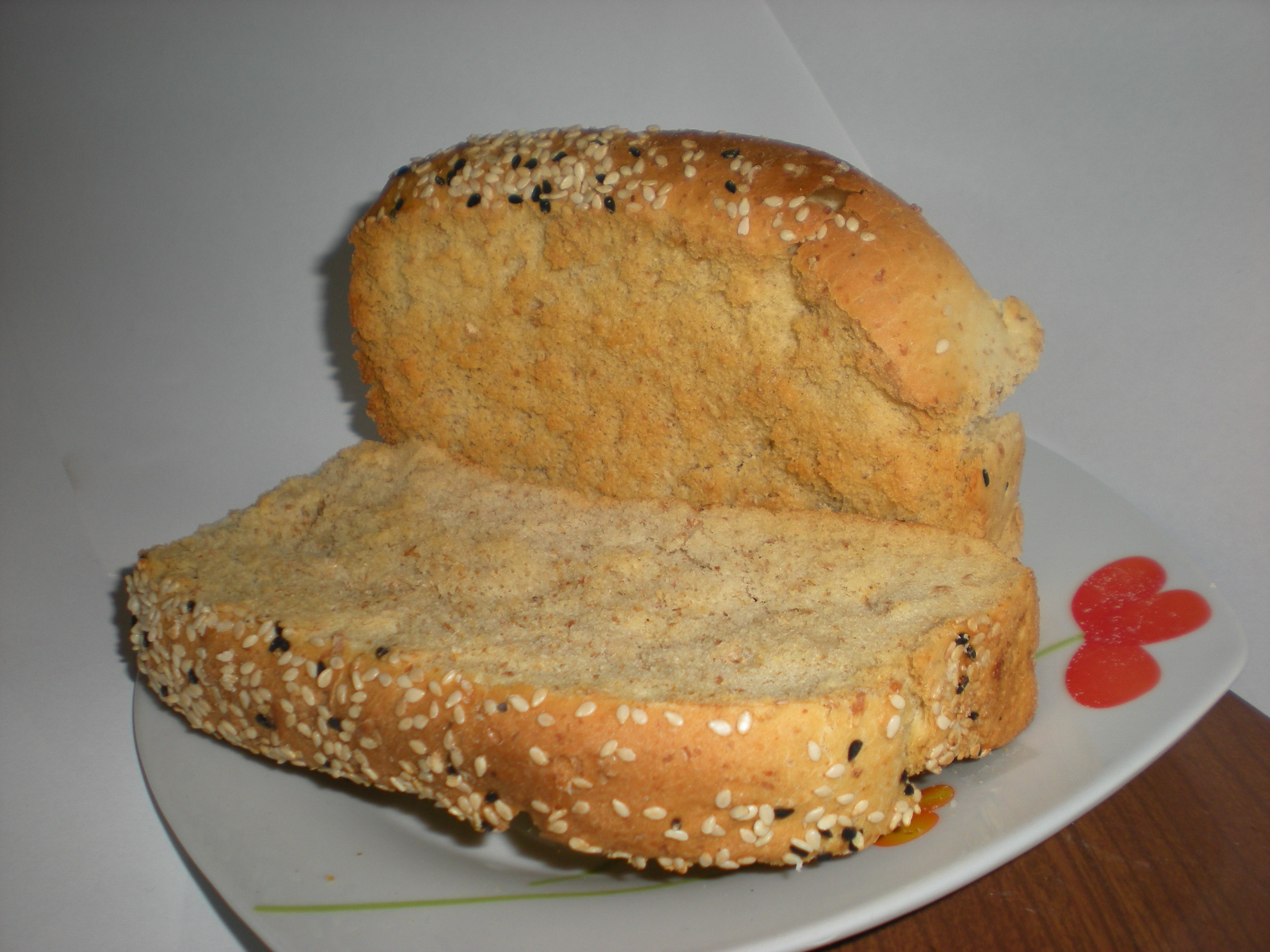
Paximadia

Paximathia (Greek: παξιμάδια), also spelt paximadia (plural), or paximadi/paximathi (singular), is a hard bread of Greek origin, similar to rusk, that is prepared with whole wheat, chick pea or barley flour. It has been referred to as being similar to biscotti or as a type of biscotti. Paximathia is a common food in Greece and many Greek bakeries sell the bread, which is often served as a breakfast food with marmalade or cheese. Paximathia is also sold in Greek specialty stores in many areas of the United States.

== Etymology ==
The name paximathia comes from the Greek term paximadion (Greek: παξιμάδιον), which may be derived from Paxamus, a 1st-century Greek author who wrote, among many things, a comprehensive cookbook. The word first appears in a recipe for laxative biscuits composed by the Greek physician Galen.

== History ==
Paximadia were traditionally consumed by Greek farmers, as well as the Byzantine military and thrifty priests. Greek farmers would eat paximathia in their fields after soaking it in water and olive oil, which would soften it. This was sometimes accompanied with foods such as homemade cheese and a few olives, often as sole accompaniments. It used to be baked in outdoor ovens approximately every ten to fifteen days, after which the bread would be sliced thickly into wedges and placed back in the ovens to dry, which would serve to preserve it. Paximadia was a staple food for the inhabitants of Crete.

== Preparation ==
Paximathia is prepared with whole wheat, chick pea or barley flour. Other ingredients used in its preparation may include eggs, vegetable oil, cinnamon, cloves and orange zest. In contemporary times, paximathia is typically baked overnight in bakers' ovens that have been turned off, whereby the bread is cooked from the remaining heat. This method cooks the bread to a dry state without creating brittleness that can cause undesirable crumbling. Paximathia is sometimes broken into pieces and served in salads after being dampened.

== Varieties ==
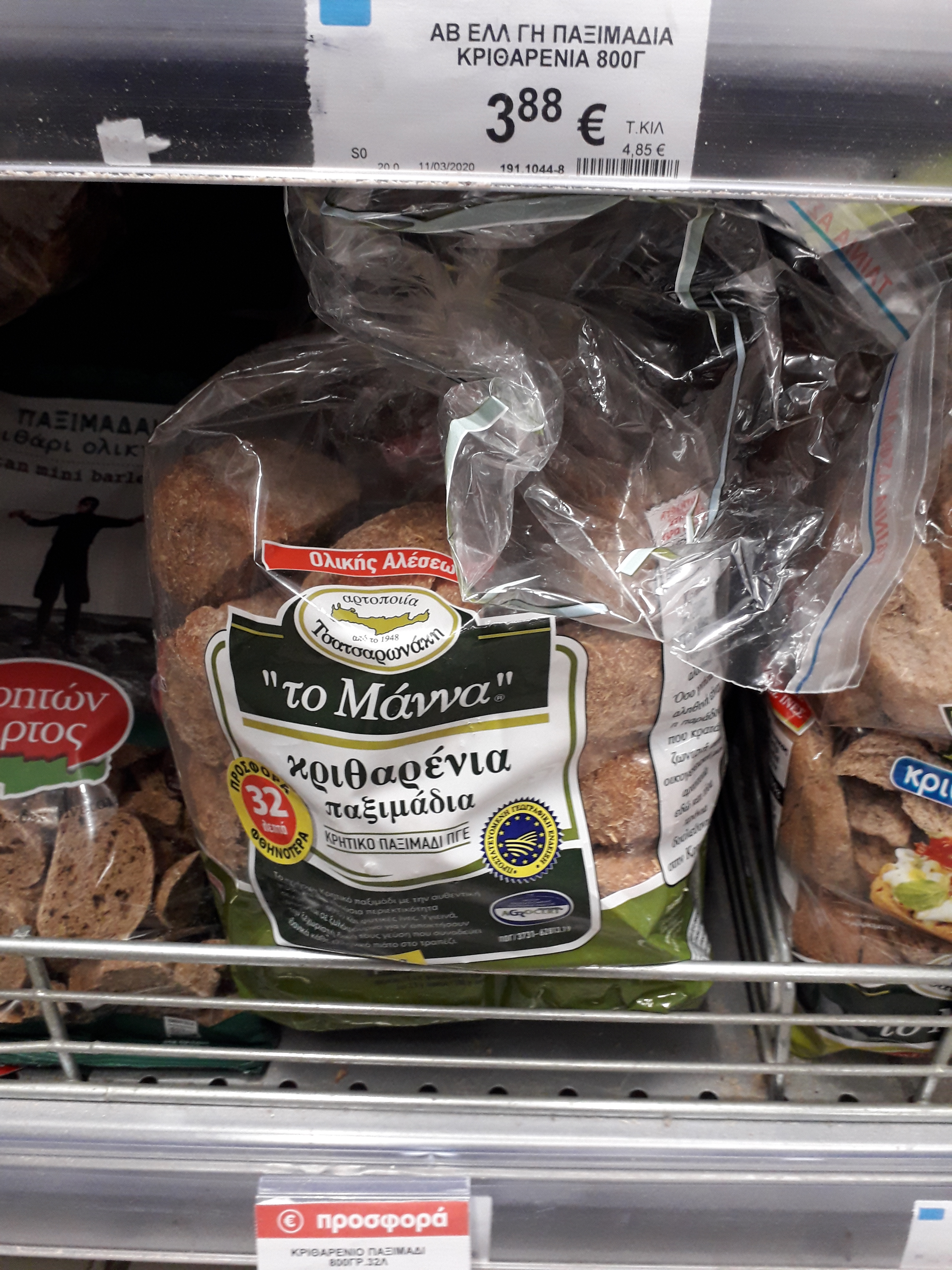
Pack of Cretan paximadia (protected geographical indication)

Paximadia form the basis of the Cretan meze dakos. In Crete, there is a variety of paximadi called Koulouri, which is ring-shaped, prepared dried, served drizzled with olive oil and may be topped with oregano and grated tomato.

There is also a bread or paximadi prepared with chick peas known as eptazymo or eftazymo.

== See also ==
- Greek cuisine
- List of breads
- List of twice-baked foods
