= Kolokythopita =

Greek squash pie

- Type: Pie
- Place of origin: Greece
- Main ingredients: Phyllo pastry, zucchini

Kolokythopita (Greek: Κολοκυθόπιτα) is a savory Greek pie made from phyllo and stuffed with a filling made primarily of zucchini and feta. Its name is a compound word which derives from "kolokýthi," (Greek for zucchini), and "pita" (Greek for pie). It is generally served as a snack or as an hors d'œuvre.
