= Dakos =

Greek cuisine starter

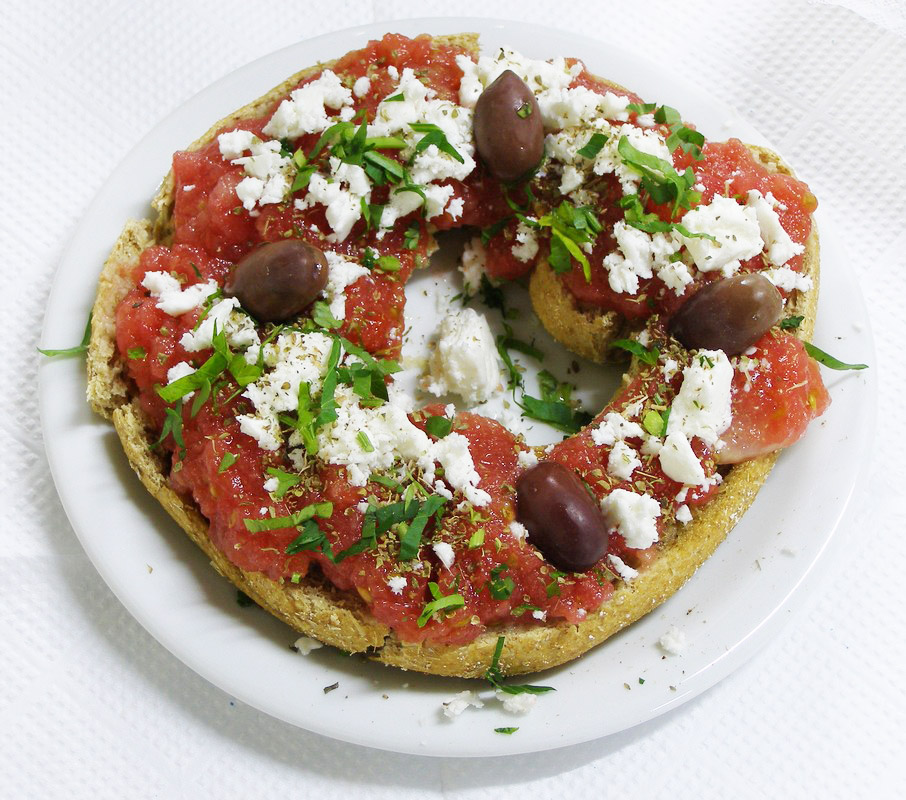
- Alternative names: Koukouvagia, Kouloukopsomo
- Type: Salad
- Place of origin: Greece
- Main ingredients: Dried bread or barley rusk, tomatoes, feta or mizithra cheese, oregano, herbs, olives

Dakos or ntakos (Greek: ντάκος), also known as koukouvagia or koukouvayia (κουκουβάγια) or kouloukopsomo, is a Cretan horiatiki (salad) consisting of a slice of soaked paximadi bread that is topped with tomatoes and cheeses such as feta or mizithra. The salad is then flavored with herbs such as dried oregano. Ingredients such as olives, capers, and caper berries are also often added to the dish.

The salad portion of the dish has been likened to other Mediterranean dishes such as panzanella in Italian cuisine and pa amb tomàquet in Catalan cuisine.

== Description ==
Dakos, also spelled as ntakos, and also known as koukouvagia or kokouvayia (κουκουβάγια, lit. 'owl'), and kouloukopsomo (from koulouki + psomi, pup + bread, allegedly the bread given to puppies under a table), is a Cretan horiatiki (Greek salad). It consists of a slice of paximadi, a certain type of barley rusk that has been soaked in either water or olive oil, which is then topped with chopped tomatoes and crumbled feta or mizithra cheese, and olive oil. The rusk itself would often have garlic rubbed on it and sea salt.

The salad is then seasoned with herbs such as dried oregano. Among other ingredients, peppers, olives (often the Koroneiki, Lianes, and Tsounates varieties), capers, and caper berries are often ingredients to the salad.

== Other ==
The salad has been likened to being similar to other dishes such as the Catalan pa amb tomàquet, the Italian frisella, and Italian panzanella. It was reported to be the best salad in the world in 2025 by TasteAtlas, a food guide.
