= List of egg topics =

This list of egg topics connects to numerous articles about eggs. The wide-ranging diversity of topics here exceeds the scope of any other single article to link all of these articles.

This list of egg topics is not intended to be complete, but it spans the vast majority of related articles. The names of articles were linked from current articles, but those article names might be changed, at a later time.

Also, names might not be the commonly accepted English-language terms for a particular topic. However, with food dishes, non-English names are often adopted into the culture, such as with "Huevos rancheros" as an egg dish found in Tex-Mex cuisine.

== Egg terminology or parts ==
- Egg (biology)
- Egg (food)
- Egg carton
- Egg spoon
- Egg white
- Egg yolk
- Eggshell
- Embryo
- Caviar
- Free-range eggs
- Chick culling
- Organic egg production
- Pasteurized eggs
- Powdered eggs
- Roe
- Separating eggs
- Zygote

Related:

- Candling
- Chalaza (chalazae)
- Haugh unit
- Rompope
- Vitelline membrane (yolk)

== Eggs as food dishes ==
A to Z egg dishes

- Balut (egg)
- Bai pong moan
- Boiled egg
- Brik
- Century egg
- Changua
- Chinese steamed eggs
- Çılbır
- Coddled egg
- Custard
- Deviled egg
- Egg bhurji
- Egg drop soup
- Egg foo young
- Egg in the basket
- Egg khagina
- Egg salad
- Egg sandwich
- Eggs Benedict
- Eggs Neptune
- Eggs Sardou
- Eggs and brains
- French toast
- Fried egg
- Fritaja
- Frittata
- Haminados
- Hangtown fry
- Huevos divorciados (Note: The word "huevos" is Spanish for "eggs", adopted into English for names in Tex-Mex cuisine.)
- Huevos motuleños
- Huevos rancheros
- Indian Omelette
- Joe's Special
- Kai yat sai
- Machacado con huevo
- Menemen (food)
- Meringue
- Moo shu pork
- Nasi goreng pattaya
- Omelette
- Omurice
- Oyster omelette
- Panagurska egg
- Pickled egg
- Poached egg
- Quiche
- Salted duck egg
- Scotch egg
- Scotch woodcock
- Scrambled eggs
- Shakshouka
- Shirred eggs
- Soufflé
- Soy egg
- Stratta
- Tamago kake gohan
- Tamagoyaki
- Tea egg
- Tortilla de patatas

=== Custard dessert topics ===
- Custard
- Banana pudding
- Bavarian cream
- Bean pie
- Berliner (pastry)
- Bird's Custard
- Boiled custard
- Boston cream pie
- Bougatsa
- Bread and butter pudding
- Buttermilk pie
- Charlotte (dessert)
- Charlotte Russe
- Cheesecake
- Clafoutis
- Cocktail bun
- Cream pie
- Crème anglaise
- Crème brûlée
- Crème caramel
- Custard pie
- Custard tart
- Éclair (pastry)
- Egg tart
- Flapper pie
- Floating island (dessert)
- Flourless chocolate cake
- Frangipane
- Frozen custard
- Galaktoboureko
- Kissel
- Kogel mogel
- Krafne
- Kremna rezina
- Malvern pudding
- Manchester tart
- Melktert
- Mille-feuille
- Nanaimo bar
- Natillas
- Neenish tart
- Norman Tart
- Pączki
- Pastel de nata
- Pio Quinto
- Pot de creme
- Profiterole
- Pumpkin pie
- Queen of Puddings
- Quindim
- Rožata
- Skolebrød
- Soufflé
- St. Honoré Cake
- Sufganiyah
- Sweet potato pie
- Tiramisu
- Trifle
- Vla
- Watalappam
- Zabaglione
- Zeppole
- Zuppa Inglese

== Eggs in culture ==
- Chicken or the egg
- Easter egg
- Egg collecting
- Egg dance
- Egg decorating
- Egg decorating in Slavic culture
- Egg drop competition
- Egg hunt
- Egging
- Egg-jarping
- Egg of Columbus
- Egg of Li Chun
- Egg rolling
- Egg tapping
- Egyptian egg oven
- Golden egg
- Humpty Dumpty
- Instagram egg
- L’eggs
- Marc Andreessen
- Pace Egg play
- Pisanica (Croatian)
- Pisanka (Polish)
- Pysanka
- Pysanka Museum
- Tempera
- The Enormous Egg
- The Incredible, Edible Egg
- This Is Your Brain on Drugs

=== Fabergé egg topics ===
- Fabergé egg (overview)
- Alexander III Commemorative (Fabergé egg)
- Alexander III Equestrian (Fabergé egg)
- Alexander III Portraits (Fabergé egg)
- Alexander Palace (Fabergé egg)
- Basket of Wild Flowers (Fabergé egg)
- Bay Tree (Fabergé egg)
- Blue Serpent Clock Egg
- Bouquet of Lilies Clock (Fabergé egg)
- Caucasus (Fabergé egg)
- Cherub with Chariot Egg
- Clover Leaf (Fabergé egg)
- Colonnade (Fabergé egg)
- Constellation (Fabergé egg)
- Czarevich (Fabergé egg)
- Danish Palaces Egg
- Diamond Trellis Egg
- Duchess of Marlborough Egg
- Empire Nephrite (Fabergé egg)
- First Hen Egg
- Gatchina Palace (Fabergé egg)
- Gorbachev Peace Egg
- Hen with Sapphire Pendant
- Imperial Coronation Egg
- Karelian Birch (Fabergé egg)
- Kelch Chanticleer (Fabergé egg)
- Lilies of the Valley (Fabergé egg)
- Mauve (Fabergé egg)
- Memory of Azov Egg
- Mosaic (Fabergé egg)
- Moscow Kremlin (Fabergé egg)
- Napoleonic (Fabergé egg)
- Nobel's Ice Egg
- Nécessaire Egg
- Order of St. George (Fabergé egg)
- Peacock (Fabergé egg)
- Pelican (Fabergé egg)
- Peter the Great (Fabergé egg)
- Pine Cone (Fabergé egg)
- Red Cross with Imperial Portraits
- Red Cross with Triptych (Fabergé egg)
- Renaissance (Fabergé egg)
- Resurrection Egg
- Revolving Miniatures Egg
- Romanov Tercentenary (Fabergé egg)
- Rose Trellis (Fabergé egg)
- Rosebud (Fabergé egg)
- Rothschild (Fabergé egg)
- Royal Danish (Fabergé egg)
- Scandinavian (Fabergé egg)
- Standart Yacht (Fabergé egg)
- Steel Military (Fabergé egg)
- Swan (Fabergé egg)
- Trans-Siberian Railway (Fabergé egg)
- Twelve Monograms (Fabergé egg)
- Twelve Panel (Fabergé egg)
- Winter (Fabergé egg)

== Egg diseases ==
- Salmonella enteritidis
- Egg allergy (food allergy)

== Oology topics ==
- Oology
- Chalaza
- Bird egg
- Clutch (eggs)
- Egg (biology)
- Egg tossing (behavior)
- Germinal disc
- Jourdain Society
- Ootheca
- Ornithology
- Oviparity
- Palaeooölogy
- Trophic egg

== See also ==
- Egg substitutes
- List of chicken breeds
- Category: Egg dishes
