= List of American breakfast foods =

This series of lists pertains to food and beverages popular in American breakfast. In the United States, breakfast often consists of either a cereal or an egg-based dish. However, pancakes, waffles, toast, and variants of the full breakfast and continental breakfast are also prevalent.

== Foods ==
- Bagel and cream cheese
- Biscuit
- Biscuits and gravy
- Boiled egg
- Bread pudding
- Breakfast burrito
- Breakfast cereal
- Breakfast sandwich
- Breakfast sausage
- Cereal
- Cinnamon roll
- Cream of Wheat
- Danish
- Doughnut
- Egg sandwich
- Eggs
- Eggs Benedict
- Energy bar
- English muffin
- French toast
- Fried egg
- Frittata
- Fritter
- Fruit
- Fruit salad
- Grilled cheese
- Grits
- Ham
- Hash browns
- Home fries
- Instant breakfast
- Kolache
- McMuffin
- Muesli
- Muffin
- Oatmeal
- Omelette
- Orange
- Pancake
- Poached egg
- Pop-Tarts
- Quiche
- Raisin bread
- Sausage
- Sausage gravy
- Scone
- Scrambled eggs
- Shrimp and grits
- Steak and eggs
- Sticky bun
- Strata
- Toast
- Toaster pastry
- Waffle

=== Regional and historical ===
- Beignet
- Brown Bobby
- Chicken and waffles
- Cornmeal mush
- Creamed eggs on toast
- Dutch baby
- Fruit pizza - a fruit dessert consisting of a sugar cookie dough "crust", a cream cheese spread, sliced fruit, and a sugary glaze
- Goetta
- Hash
- Hoppel poppel - a German-inspired dish known for using up leftovers, including eggs, potatoes, onions, meats, herbs, and/or veggies
- Huevos rancheros
- Jersey Breakfast
- Migas
- Popcorn cereal - consumed by Americans in the 1800s, consisting of popcorn with milk and a sweetener.
- Scrapple
- Shrimp and grits

== Toppings ==
- Blueberries
- Butter
- Cinnamon
- Compote
- Cottage cheese
- Cream cheese
- Honey
- Hot sauce
- Jam
- Jelly
- Maple syrup
- Margarine
- Marmalade
- Molasses
- Nutella
- Peanut butter
- Pineapples
- Powdered sugar
- Salsa
- Strawberries

== Beverages ==
- Chocolate milk
- Coffee and other coffee beverages
- Horchata
- Hot chocolate
- Juice
- Milk
- Milk substitute
- Orange juice
- Smoothie
- Tea
- Tomato juice
