= List of egg dishes =

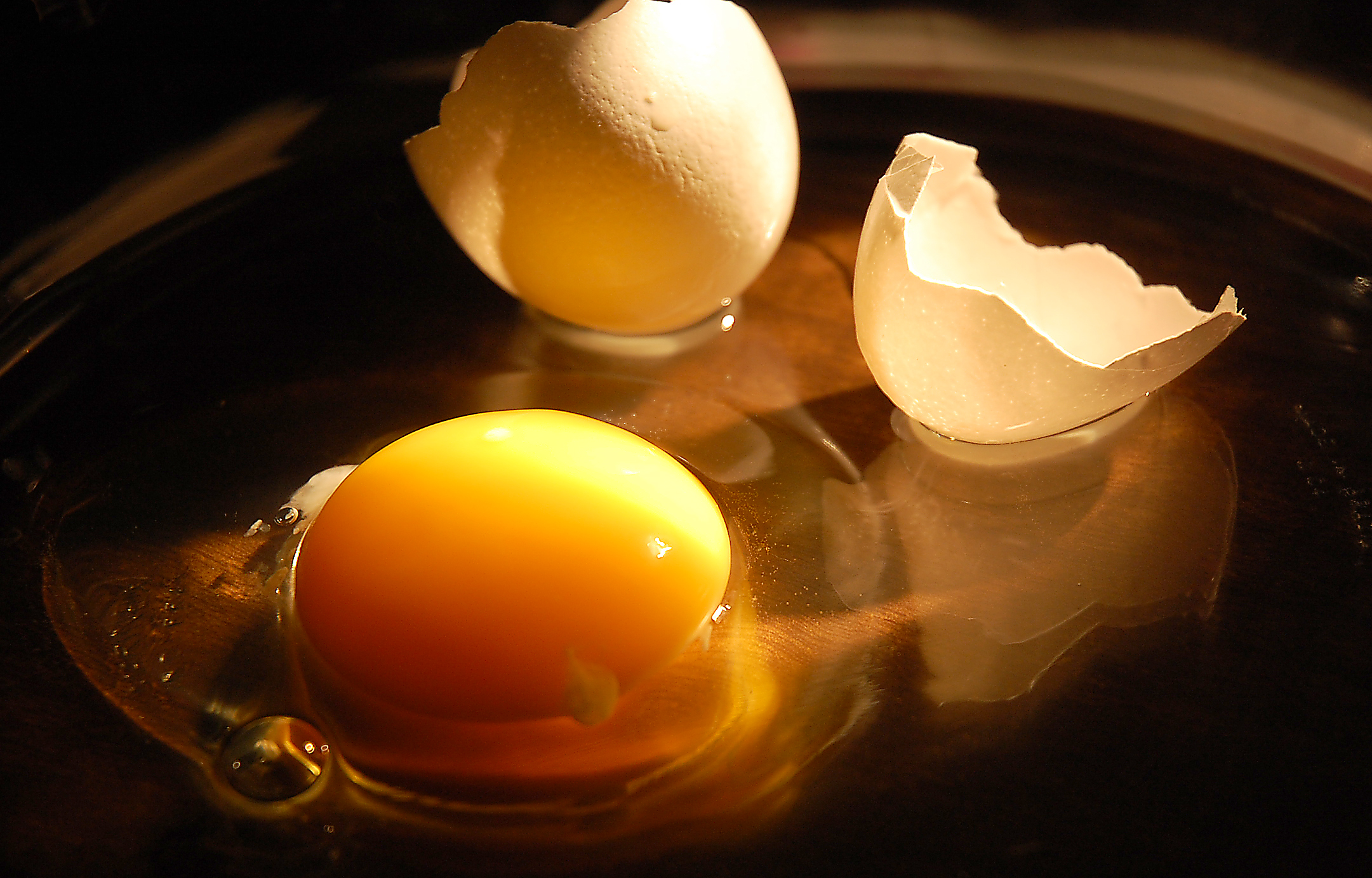
A raw cracked chicken egg

This is a list of notable egg dishes and beverages. Eggs are laid by females of many different species, including birds, reptiles, amphibians, and fish, and have been eaten by humans for thousands of years. Bird and reptile eggs consist of albumen (egg white) and vitellus (egg yolk), contained within many different thin membranes all surrounded by a protective eggshell.

Popular choices for egg consumption are chicken, duck, quail, roe, caviar, and emu. The chicken egg is the egg most often consumed by humans.

== Egg dishes ==
| Name | Image | Flavor | Origin | Description |
|---|---|---|---|---|
| Akashiyaki | | Savory | Japan | A small piece of octopus encased in a round egg mix, developed into takoyaki. Called simply tamago-yaki (egg-cook) by the Akashi locals. |
| Akok | | Sweet | Malaysia | |
| Aletria | | Sweet | Portugal | |
| Ant egg soup | | Savory | Laos | Soup made from the eggs of the weaver ant species Oecophylla smaragdina. |
| Avgolemono | | Savory | Mediterranean | A family of sauces and soups made with egg and lemon juice, mixed with broth. |
| Baghali ghatogh | | Savory | Iran | A khoresh (Persian stew) made with baghalas (Rashtian faba beans), dill, and eggs. Usually served with kateh (Persian rice dish) in the northern provinces of Iran. |
| Bai pong moan | | Savory | Cambodia | A Cambodian dish, consisting of fried eggs and white rice |
| Baid Mutajjan | | Savory | Egypt | Also called Baid Mazalil or Baid Mezaghlil. An egg is hard boiled, peeled, then pan fried whole with butter and spices. |
| Balut | | Savory | Southeast Asia | A steamed fertilized duck egg containing a partially developed duck embryo, it is commonly sold as street food in the Philippines. |
| Basted egg | | Plain | | Sunny-side-up eggs that are slightly cooked on the top. This can be accomplished by spooning fat from the pan onto the eggs or by turning them and cooking the yolk side for a few seconds. |
| Boiled egg | | Plain | | This dish is boiled either long enough for the yolk to become solid ("hard boiled") or just long enough for the egg white to solidify ("soft boiled"). A similar result may be achieved by steaming the eggs rather than boiling. |
| Brik | | Savory | Tunisia | A Tunisian dish consisting of thin warka pastry around a filling commonly deep fried. The best-known version is the egg brik, a whole egg in a triangular pastry pocket with chopped onion, tuna, harissa and parsley. |
| Buttered eggs | | Plain | England | Scrambled eggs with additional butter melted and stirred into the egg mixture before cooking. |
| Carbonara | | Savory | Italy | An Italian pasta dish from Rome made with egg, hard cheese, guanciale (or pancetta), and pepper. |
| Century egg | | Savory | China | Originated as an ingredient or an appetizer in Chinese cuisine made by preserving duck, chicken or quail eggs in a mixture of clay, ash, salt, quicklime, and rice hulls for several weeks to several months, depending on the method of processing. Now commonly found in some East and Southeast Asian countries, especially those with Chinese heritage. |
| Chataamari | | Savory | Nepal | A savory crepe, topped with egg, meat, and vegetables. |
| Chawanmushi | | Savory | Japan | An egg custard dish found in Japan that uses the seeds of ginkgo. |
| Chinese steamed eggs | | Savory | China | A Chinese home-style dish found all over China. Eggs are beaten to a consistency similar to that used for an omelette, water is added and the mixture steamed. |
| Chipsi mayai | | Savory | Tanzania | The most popular street food in Tanzania that is an omelette with chips (french fries). |
| Çılbır | | Savory | Turkey | Poached eggs with yogurt, often with garlic mixed in |
| Creamed eggs on toast | | Savory | United States | A breakfast dish consisting of toast or biscuits covered in a gravy made from bechamel sauce and chopped hard-boiled eggs. |
| Croque Madame | | Savory | France | A croque-monsieur sandwich served with a fried egg or poached egg on top |
| Coddled egg | | Plain | | In cooking, coddled eggs are gently or lightly cooked eggs. |
| Custard pie | | Sweet | | A custard pie is any type of uncooked custard mixture added to an uncooked or partially cooked crust and baked together. |
| Danbing | | Savory | Taiwan | A Taiwanese breakfast dish which is made by kneading flour, potato starch, glutinous rice flour, and water into a thin dough, and an omelet is baked on top. |
| Datemaki | | Savory | Japan | A rolled omelet made with fish paste. |
| Doces de ovos | | Sweet | Portugal | |
| Dashimaki tamago | | Savory | Japan | Tamagoyaki (Omelet rolls) which includes dashi. |
| Deep fried egg | | Savory | England | Sometimes served breaded, and sometimes prepared using only yolks. |
| Deviled eggs | | Savory | England | Yolks of hard-boiled eggs are mashed with cream or mayonnaise, mustard, and seasonings and then mounded or piped into the white of the boiled egg. Served cold, often al fresco. |
| Eggah | | Savory | Arab Cuisine | Eggs binding a filling of vegetables and meat, sometimes with Arabic spices. |
| Egg bhurji | | Savory | India | Similar to scrambled eggs, mixed with fried onions and spices. |
| Egg kalakki | | Savory | India | "Kalakki" in Tamil means "to mix". It is a soft scrambled egg with a little curry added into it. Kalakki is a famous food from southern Tamil Nadu. Nowadays, it is a very sought after dish in many restaurants all over Tamil Nadu. |
| Egg curry | | Savory | Bangladesh | A spicy dish made with boiled eggs, tomatoes, and fried onions and normally eaten with bread or rotis. |
| Egg butter | | Savory | Estonia, Finland | A mixture of butter and hard boiled eggs. |
| Egg custard | | Sweet | | The most common custards are used in custard desserts or dessert sauces and typically include sugar and vanilla; however, savory custards are also found in dishes such as quiche. |
| Egg tart | | Sweet | Hong Kong | A kind of custard tart found in Chinese cuisine derived from the English custard tart and Portuguese pastel de nata. |
| Eggs Kejriwal | | Savory | Mumbai | Eggs, melted cheese, and chilis served on toast |
| Fios de ovos | | Sweet | Portugal | Angel hair, called in Portuguese fios de ovos ("egg threads"), is a traditional Portuguese sweet food made of eggs (chiefly yolks), drawn into thin strands and boiled in sugar syrup. |
| Foi tong | | Sweet | Thailand | Derived from Portugal's fios de ovos. |
| Egg foo yung | | Savory | China, Chinese diaspora | Eggs are stirred together with vegetables such as bean sprouts and scallions, then quickly cooked in a hot skillet or deep-fried in oil, and served with gravy. |
| Egg in a basket | | Savory | | An egg fried within a hole in a slice of bread. |
| Egg drop soup | | Savory | China | A Chinese soup of wispy beaten eggs in boiled chicken broth. |
| Egg salad | | Savory | United States | Egg salad is often used as a sandwich filling, typically made of chopped hard-boiled eggs, mayonnaise, mustard, minced celery, onion, salt, pepper, and paprika. It is also often used as a topping on green salads. It is also sometimes referred to as egg mayonnaise. |
| Egg sandwich | | Savory | | A sandwich with some kind of egg filling. Sliced hard boiled eggs, egg salad and scrambled eggs are popular options. Additional fillings such as various meats and cheeses abound. Common versions are the fried egg sandwich and the bacon, egg and cheese sandwich. |
| Egg thread nets | | Savory | Thailand | Used to hold other foods. |
| Eggs and brains | | Savory | | Pork brains (or those of another mammal) and scrambled eggs. It is a dish of the Portuguese cuisine known as Omolete de Mioleira. |
| Eggs Beauregard | | Savory | United States | Biscuits and gravy with fried egg and sausage. |
| Eggs Blackstone | | Savory | United States | Poached eggs, each stacked on a slice of roasted tomato, bacon and English muffin half, topped with hollandaise sauce. |
| Eggs Benedict | | Savory | United States | Poached eggs on Canadian bacon on top of toasted English muffin halves covered with hollandaise sauce. |
| Eggs do pyaza | | Savory | India | A type of dopiaza made with eggs. |
| Eggs moghlai | | Savory | India, United Kingdom | A savoury, rich deep curry consisting of sliced hard boiled eggs made with tomatoes, saffron cashews yogurt garam masala chili paste, nuts and carraway seeds. |
| Eggs Neptune | | Savory | United States | A variation of Eggs Benedict, with crab meat replacing Canadian bacon. |
| Eggs Florentine | | Savory | United States | A variation of Eggs Benedict, with spinach replacing Canadian bacon. |
| Eggs Royale | | Savory | United States | A variation on Eggs Benedict, replacing the ham with smoked salmon. |
| Egg sausage | | Savory | Taiwan | A Taiwanese street food originating from Keelung in northern Taiwan. This distinctive hot-pot ingredient is crafted by filling pig intestine casings with seasoned egg liquid. When boiled, the egg expands inside the casing, creating plump, round ends that resemble tiny macarons—hence its colloquial nickname of Taiwanese Macaron. |
| Ervilhas com ovos | | Savory | Portugal | A sort of stew or casserole consisting of either hard boiled or fried eggs(the latter of which being sometimes cooked directly into the recipient) marinated in a tomato based sauce with peas, meat (usually chorizo) and carrots |
| Eyerlekh | | Savory | Ashkenazi (Jewish) | Creamy, flavorful unlaid eggs found inside just-slaughtered chickens and typically cooked in soup. |
| Farofa de ovos | | Savory | Brazil | |
| Flæskeæggekage | | Savory | Denmark | An oven baked or pan fried thick omelette (egg cake) topped with crispy bacon, tomatoes and chives. |
| Floating island | | Sweet | France | A dessert consisting of meringue floating on crème anglaise (a vanilla custard). The meringue is prepared from whipped egg whites, sugar, and vanilla extract and baked in a bain-marie. The crème anglaise is prepared with the egg yolks, vanilla, and hot milk, and then briefly cooked. |
| French toast | | Savory or Sweet | | Bread dipped in raw egg yolk is shallow fried on a pan. Often topped with a sprinkling of powdered sugar, fruit, or maple syrup. |
| Fried egg | | Plain | | Cooked in hot grease in a skillet in a variety of ways to produce differing results: eggs can be cooked lightly on one side only ("sunny side up"), cooked lightly on one side and turned over briefly ("over easy"), cooked on both sides so the white is solid but the yolk still soft and runny ("over medium") and thoroughly cooked on both sides with the yolk solid ("over well"), or with the yolk broken ("over hard"), among others. |
| Frittata | | Savory | | An Italian egg-based dish similar to an omelette or crustless quiche, enriched with additional ingredients such as meats, cheeses, vegetables or pasta. |
| Frozen custard | | Sweet | United States | A cold dessert similar to ice cream, but made with eggs in addition to cream and sugar. |
| Gari foto | | Savory | Ghana | A dish usually served with plain rice or Jollof rice, if served as a main dish.It consist of Garri mixed with a spicy tomato stew |
| Gyeran-mari | | Savory | Korea | A savory banchan (side dish) made with beaten eggs mixed with several finely diced ingredients such as onion, carrots, meats and cheese, among others. |
| Gyeranppang | | Savory or Sweet | Korea | A snack food prepared with egg and rice flour. |
| Ham and eggs | | Savory | United States | A dish combining various preparations of its main ingredients, ham and eggs. |
| Haminados | | Savory | Sephardic Jewish | Eggs braised or cooked in Shabbat stew or cooked separately. |
| Hangtown fry | | Savory | United States | A type of omelette made famous during the California Gold Rush in the 1850s. The most common version includes bacon and oysters combined with eggs and fried together. |
| Huevos divorciados | | Savory | Mexico | A Mexican breakfast featuring two fried eggs separated by a column of chilaquiles, and each egg is covered by a different salsa. |
| Huevos motuleños | | Savory | Mexico | A breakfast food made with eggs on tortillas with black beans and cheese, often with other ingredients such as ham, peas, plantains, and salsa picante. |
| Huevos pericos | | Savory | Colombia, Venezuela | Scrambled eggs with scallions, tomatoes and peppers. |
| Huevos rancheros | | Savory | Mexico | Eggs either poached in salsa or fried, served on top of corn tortillas and frijoles. Toppings may include avocado slices, melted cheese, sour cream, cilantro, etc. |
| Huevos reales | | Sweet | Spain, Latin America | a diamond cut cake made with egg yolks, pine nuts, raisin, sugar, water and dry sherry.It is always topped with a raisin. |
| Huevos rotos | | Savory | Spain | Fried or scrambled eggs are served on top of fried potatoes, sometimes with ham or other types of meat such as chorizo. If the eggs are fried, they may be put whole on top of the potatoes or they may be cut up. |
| Indian omelette | | Savory | | A version of the omelette found in Indian cuisine. Its main ingredients are eggs, herbs, tomatoes and spices that vary by region. |
| Iritamago | | Savory | Japan | A Japanese dish, consisting of finely scrambled eggs with soya sauce. |
| Iron egg | | Savory | Taiwan | A Taiwanese dish, consisting of small eggs that have been repeatedly stewed in a mix of spices and air-dried. The resulting eggs are dark brown on the outside, chewy in texture, and very flavourful compared to standard boiled eggs. |
| Kai kwan | | Savory | Thailand | |
| Kai look koei | | Savory | Thailand | Literally meaning son in law eggs (kai, egg and look koei, son in law), it is boiled eggs(most commonly of duck) cut in half,(sometimes fried again), who are then sometimes put in a broth consisting of fish sauce, tamarin paste, palm or brown sugar, chili paste, white sesame seeds,garlic, fried shallots, red bell pepper, cilantro.Though mainly these ingredients are put on top of the egg. |
| Khanom mo Kaeng | | Sweet | Thailand | A traditional Thai dessert. It is similar to an egg custard or a kind of flan. Made with coconut milk, eggs, palm sugar, white sugar, salt, shallots and a bit of oil. |
| Kaiserschmarrn | | Sweet | Austria and Germany | |
| Katsudon | | Savory | Japan | Tonkatsu(pork cutlet), egg, and rice in a bowl. |
| Kerak telor | | Savory | Indonesia | Indonesian for "Crusted egg". An egg cuisine popular among the Betawi people of Jakarta, It is made from glutinous rice cooked with egg and served with serundeng (fried shredded coconut) with fried shallots or dried shrimp as its topping. |
| Khagina | | Savory | Iran, Pakistan | |
| Kogel mogel | | Sweet | Eastern Europe | An egg-based homemade dessert once popular in parts of Europe and the Caucasus. It is made from egg yolks, sugar, and flavorings such as honey, vanilla, cocoa or rum, and is similar to eggnog or zabaione. |
| Khai yat sai | | Savory | Thailand | A type of Thai omelette; the name means "stuffed eggs". The egg is cooked lightly, topped with various ingredients and then folded over. |
| Khanom khai | | Sweet | Thailand | A dessert prepared using eggs, sugar and flour. |
| Kedgeree | | Savory | British corruption of Indian Khichdi. | A dish consisting of cooked, flaked fish (sometimes smoked haddock), boiled rice, parsley, hard-boiled eggs, curry powder, butter or cream, and occasionally sultanas. |
| Kuku (food) | | Savory | Iran | A genre of egg dishes cooked in a pancake shape with one or more additional ingredients. |
| Kuro-tamago hard-boiled egg | | Savory | Japan | A variety of hard boiled egg local to Ōwakudani, Kanagawa Prefecture, Japan. Owing to the sulfur and mineral-rich water the eggs are boiled in, the shells turn a characteristic black colour. |
| Lampreia de ovos | | Sweet | Portugal | a classic Portuguese conventual sweet, typical of Christmas and Easter, made with egg threads, soft-boiled eggs, and sugar syrup. Molded in the shape of the lamprey fish, it is decorated with crystallized cherries and egg threads, standing out for its intense flavor and delicate texture. |
| Loco moco | | Savory | United States | White rice topped with a hamburger patty, a fried egg, and brown gravy. |
| Machaca and eggs | | Savory | Northwest Mexico, Southwest United States | A dish consisting of shredded beef with scrambled eggs, and optionally other ingredients such as onions and chili peppers. |
| Matzah brei | | Savory | Ashkenazi Jewish | Matzo fried with eggs. |
| Menemen | | Savory | Turkey | A popular traditional Turkish dish which includes eggs, tomato, green peppers, and spices such as ground black and red pepper cooked in olive oil. |
| Meringue | | Sweet | France, Switzerland | Traditionally made from whipped egg whites and sugar, and occasionally an acidic ingredient such as lemon, vinegar, or cream of tartar. |
| Migas | | Savory | Mexico, Tex-Mex | A dish consisting of corn and flour tortillas mixed with other ingredients, which frequently include eggs. |
| Mish-mash | | Savory | Bulgaria | A spring dish made with fresh vegetables (typically tomatoes, peppers and onions), eggs and sirene. |
| Mirza-Qasemi | | Savory | Iran | An egg-bound dish based on tandoori or grilled aubergine, and seasoned with other ingredients such as garlic, oil, tomato, salt, and pepper. |
| Murtabak | | Savory | Yemen | A stuffed pancake or pan-fried bread with an egg and various other fillings. Murtabak is often described as spicy folded omelette pancake with bits of vegetables and meat. |
| Nargesi (Spinach Omelette) | | Savory | Iran | Made with eggs, fried onion and spinach, and spiced with salt, garlic, and pepper. Named after Narcissus flower. |
| Nargesi kebab | | Savory | South Asia | A kind of Kofta with a chicken egg in the middle. Named after Narcissus flower because when koftas are cut, they look like the flower's petals. |
| Okonomiyaki | | Savory | Japan | An egg-and-flour mix cooked on a griddle with various added ingredients. |
| Oeuf mayonnaise | | Savory | France | A chilled, soft-boiled egg cut in half and covered with a sauce made of mayonnaise and Dijon mustard. |
| Omelette | | Plain | Ancient Persia | A dish made from beaten (but not further stirred while cooking) eggs quickly cooked with butter or oil, in a frying pan, sometimes folded around a filling such as cheese, vegetables, meat (often ham), or some combination of the above. |
| Onsen tamago | | Plain | Japan | "Hot-spring eggs", traditional Japanese boiled eggs (tamago) slow-cooked in the water of hot springs (onsen). |
| Omelette surprise | | Sweet | | A dessert similar to a baked Alaska, consisting of a sponge cake covered with ice cream and a layer of beaten egg whites and browned in an oven. |
| Omelette de la mère Poulard | | Plain | France | A fluffy soufflé omelette which has been called the world's most famous omelette. |
| Ovos Moles de Aveiro | | Sweet | Portugal | A Portuguese pastry with a filling of egg yolks, sugar, and occasionally chocolate encased within a shell-shaped rice paper or wheat flour casing. Designated a product with Protected Geographical Indication by the European Union. |
| Œufs en gelée | | Savory | France | Poached eggs encapsulated within aspic. |
| Ovos moles de papaia | | Sweet | Mozambique | An egg yolk and papaya pudding. |
| Oyakodon | | Sweet and Savory | Japan | A rice bowl dish of Japanese origin that consists of a soy sauce based broth and uses both the chicken and the egg for toppings, and tastes sweet and salty. Its name, "Oyakodon" means "parent and child" which is to refer to the use of chicken (parent) and egg (child) in the recipe. |
| Oyster omelette | | Savory | China, Taiwan | A dish of Hokkien and Teochew origin that is renowned for its savory flavor in its native Chaoshan and Minnan region, along with Taiwan and many parts of Southeast Asia such as the Philippines, Thailand, Malaysia and Singapore due to the influence of the Hokkien and Teochew diaspora. Variations of the dish exist in some southern regions of China. |
| Panagyurishte-style eggs | | Savory | Bulgaria | Poached eggs on a bed of yogurt and sirene, seasoned with butter and paprika. |
| Pasteis de nata | | Sweet | Portugal | A Portuguese egg custard tart pastry, optionally dusted with cinnamon. |
| Pastel de Tentúgal | | Sweet | Portugal | |
| Pavlova | | Sweet | Australia, New Zealand | A cake-shaped block of baked meringue, typically topped with fruit and whipped cream. |
| Pickled egg | | Savory | | Typically hard boiled eggs that are cured in vinegar or brine. Although they originated from the need to preserve food rather than a desire to create a delicacy, pickled eggs are today a popular snack or hors d'œuvre in pubs, bars and taverns. |
| Poached egg | | Plain | | An egg that has been cooked by poaching, in simmering liquid. The term is also applied to a method whereby the egg is placed in a cup, suspended over simmering water, using a special pan called an "egg-poacher". |
| Queijada | | Savory or Sweet | Portugal | |
| Quiche | | Savory | France | Quiche has a pastry crust and a filling of eggs and milk or cream. It can be made with vegetables, meat, or seafood. |
| Quindim | | Sweet | Brazil | A baked dessert, made chiefly from sugar, egg yolks, and ground coconut. |
| Rafanata | | Savory | Italy | A type of frittata made with eggs, horseradish, and pecorino cheese. Variations may include boiled potatoes and sausage. |
| Refried eggs | | Savory | United States | Sliced hard-boiled eggs, refried with or without extra vegetables. |
| Salted duck egg | | Savory | China | A Chinese dish that consists of a duck egg pickled in salt water brine. When cooked, it develops a unique flavor and consistency; the whites are saltier, and the yolk has a creamy texture. |
| Scalloped eggs | | Savory | United States | a sort of gratin made from a base of potatoes then fried or poached eggs with chives placed on top and put in the oven.common topping include cheese, bacon, and cream. |
| Scotch egg | | Savory | United Kingdom | A hard-boiled egg wrapped in sausage meat, coated in bread crumbs, and baked or deep-fried. |
| Scotch woodcock | | Savory | United Kingdom | Scrambled eggs on toast topped with anchovy |
| Scrambled eggs | | Plain | | A dish made from beaten egg whites and yolks of (usually chicken eggs). Beaten eggs are put into a hot pot or pan (usually greased) and stirred frequently, forming curds as they coagulate. |
| Shirred eggs | | Plain | | A dish in which eggs are baked in a flat-bottomed dish; the name originates from the type of dish traditionally used to bake the eggs, although they are also known as baked eggs. An alternative cooking method is to crack the eggs into individual ramekins and cook them in a water bath, creating the French dish eggs. |
| Shakshouka | | Savory | Middle East | Poached eggs cooked in tomato and paprika sauce, seasoned with harisa, cumin and salt. Might be served with cheese. |
| Silog | | Savory | Philippines | A class of Filipino breakfast dishes containing sinangag (fried rice) and itlog (egg), served with various meat dishes, such as tapa, longganisa or ham. |
| Smoked egg | | Savory | China | Can be prepared with hard boiled eggs that are then smoked, or by smoking uncooked eggs in their shells. |
| Soufflé | | Savory or Sweet | France | A baked egg-based dish originating in France in the early eighteenth century, combined with various other ingredients it can be served as a savory main dish or sweetened as a dessert. |
| Spanish omelette | | Savory | Spain | A dish consisting of a thick egg omelette made with potatoes and sometimes onions, and fried in olive oil; it is also known as tortilla de patatas or Spanish tortilla. |
| Stracciatella (soup) | | Savory | Italy | Soup made from thin strands of beaten egg mixture in a meat broth. |
| Stratta | | Savory | United States | The most common modern variant is a brunch dish, made from a mixture which mainly consists of bread, eggs and cheese. It may also include meat or vegetables. |
| Steak and eggs | | Savory | Australia | Prepared with beefsteak and eggs. Several variations exist. |
| Sweet omelette | | Sweet | | As the name implies, a variation of the regular omelette but with added sweet ingredients like prune . |
| Tahu Telur | | Savory | Indonesia | A dish consisting of half-cooked fried tofu and fried egg served with rice cake, some bean sprouts, and doused with shrimp paste and peanut sauce seasoning, topped with a sprinkling of crackers. |
| Takoyaki | | Savory | Japan | A small piece of octopus encased in a round egg mix, developed from akashiyaki. |
| Tamago kake gohan | | Savory | Japan | Raw egg served on plain rice. |
| Tamagoyaki | | Savory | Japan | Made by rolling together several layers of cooked egg, sometimes with sugar, soy sauce, mirin, or other additives. |
| Tea egg | | Savory | China | A typical Chinese savory food commonly sold as a snack, in which a boiled egg is cracked slightly and then boiled again in tea, as well as sauce or spices. |
| Telur gulung | | Savory | Indonesia | An egg is fried and then rolled using a skewer which is usually made of bamboo. |
| Telur pindang | | Savory | Indonesia | An egg boiled slowly in water mixed with salt, soy sauce, shallot skins, and teak leaf. |
| Tokneneng | | Savory | Philippines | A tempura-like Filipino street food made by deep-frying orange batter covered hard-boiled chicken or duck eggs. |
| Trouxas de ovos | | Sweet | Portugal | condensed egg threads in the shape of a roll and eaten with syrup |
| Tunisian tajine | | Savory | Tunisia | A baked egg dish that has a ragout; a starch element is added and it is often served in squares. |
| Uovo sbattuto | | | Italy | A breakfast dish that is sometimes prepared as a drink. |
| Yemas de San Leandro | | Sweet | Spain | a cake made with a dough where inside is encased a creamy yellow filling. |
| Zabaione | zabaione in a glass | Sweet | Italy | A dessert made from egg yolks, sugar and wine. |
| Zucchini slice | | Savory | Australia | A baked dish of eggs, cheese, and zucchini. |

== Egg drinks ==
| Name | Image | Flavor | Origin | Description |
|---|---|---|---|---|
| Bombardino | Bombardino in a glass | Sweet | Italy | A hot drink made with egg liquor (Vov or Zabov) and rum or brandy, with optional whipped cream on top. |
| Cocktail | | Sweet | United States | Many cocktails have eggs as an ingredient. For example, sours and fizzes (such as the pictured Ramos Gin Fizz) often include a raw egg white, and flips include a whole raw egg. |
| Egg coffee | | Sweet | Vietnam | A Vietnamese drink traditionally prepared with egg yolks, sugar, condensed milk and robusta coffee |
| Eggnog | eggnog in a glass | Sweet | United States | Sweetened dairy-based beverage traditionally made with milk, cream, sugar, whipped egg whites, and egg yolks. |
| Egg soda | | Sweet | Vietnam | A sweet drink made from egg yolk, sweetened condensed milk, and club soda |
| Rompope | Rompope with coffee | Sweet | Mexico | A drink made with eggs, milk, vanilla flavouring, and rum. |
| Tamagozake | | | Japan | A drink consisting of heated sake, sugar and a raw egg. |
| Teh talua | | Sweet | Indonesia | A drink consists of tea powder, raw egg, sugar, and citrus. |
| Uovo sbattuto | | Sweet | Italy | A sweet breakfast dish made of sugar and egg yolks that is often prepared as a coffee drink |

== See also ==
- Egg as food
- Egg substitutes
- List of egg topics
- List of brunch foods
- List of custard desserts
