= Eggs Kejriwal =

Egg, cheese, and chili dish served on toast

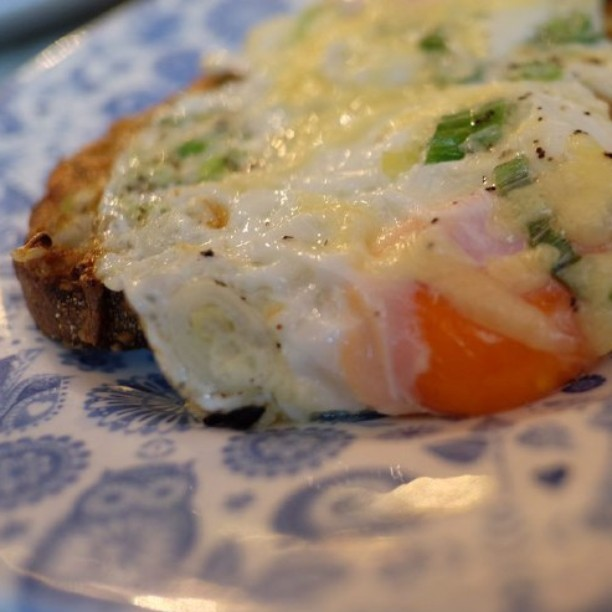
- Alternative names: Kejriwal
- Course: Breakfast, snack
- Place of origin: South Mumbai
- Main ingredients: Eggs, cheese, chilis, bread

Eggs Kejriwal, or simply Kejriwal, is a dish of eggs topped with cheese and chilis, typically served over toast, that was developed in South Mumbai in the 1960s and became popular outside that area in the 2010s.

== Origin and history ==
The dish was developed in the 1960s in South Mumbai; according to Tejal Rao, it was not well-known outside of that area before the 2010s. In the 2010s it began appearing on the menus of trendier upscale restaurants as part of India's modern dining scene. The dish's growth in popularity in that decade may have been related to the growing prominence of Indian politician Arvind Kejriwal. It was invented at the Willingdon Sports Club and according to Rao became popular in "Mumbai’s exclusive social-club circuit".

The dish is named after a Willingdon Club regular, Devi Prasad Kejriwal, who requested the combination so frequently that the club named it after him and placed it on their menu. According to food writer Vikram Doctor, Kejriwal was a Marwari, a group that traditionally eat cheese but not eggs. While Kejriwal loved eggs, he didn't eat them in his home and didn't like to be seen eating them publicly, so ordering them covered in melted cheese and chilis made his departure from tradition less noticeable.

== Ingredients, preparation and serving ==
The original dish was a simple combination of a poached egg served on toast and topped with a slice of processed cheese, probably Amul, and chilis.

The dish always includes eggs and cheese and typically includes chilis; other ingredients such as ghee or butter, and onion or chutney may be included. It may be baked, broiled or cooked over direct heat, is usually served on toast and may be served with ketchup. Typically, whole unbeaten eggs are used, but the eggs can also be scrambled.

The dish can be eaten as a meal, often breakfast, or as a snack and is also served in sandwich form as a street food.

== Reception ==
In 2016, New York Times restaurant critic Pete Wells named the version at Floyd Cardoz's Paowalla one of the top ten New York City restaurant dishes of the year.

In 2024, New York Times Cooking featured a version in a recipe on their site.

== Similar dishes ==
- Creamed eggs on toast
- Egg in the basket
- Eggs Benedict
- Fried egg sandwich
- Scotch woodcock
- Strata
- Welsh rarebit
