= Egg bread =

Egg bread may refer to:

- French toast
- Egg in the basket
- Gyeran-ppang
- egg-based bread
  - Challah
  - Brioche

== See also ==
- Egg sandwich
