= Eggs Beauregard =

American egg dish

Eggs Beauregard is an American term that is used for two egg dishes. The dish was once made with hard boiled eggs served in cream sauce, but in modern times the term is used for a dish of biscuits and gravy with fried egg and sausage. The modern form of the dish is similar to Eggs Benedict, but made with biscuits, sausage, and country gravy.

== Preparation ==
In the 19th century and early 20th century, the historic version of the dish was made with finely crumbled hard boiled eggs. The cream sauce was made with butter, flour and milk into which only the egg whites would be added. The egg mixture was spread on slices of toast and topped with egg yolk and finished in the broiler.

A French style variation of the same dish is made as a molded egg dish cooked in a water bath, served in a pastry shell over eggplant with a demi-glace sauce and truffle garnish.

== Modern dish ==
The modern form of the dish is a specialty of the Cuisine of the American South. It is similar to Eggs Benedict and sometimes called Southern Eggs Benedict or Country Benedict. It is made with biscuits, sausage, and country gravy, but some variations use ham or bacon instead of sausage.

== See also ==
- List of egg dishes
