= Egg salad =

Hard-boiled eggs chopped and mixed with other ingredients

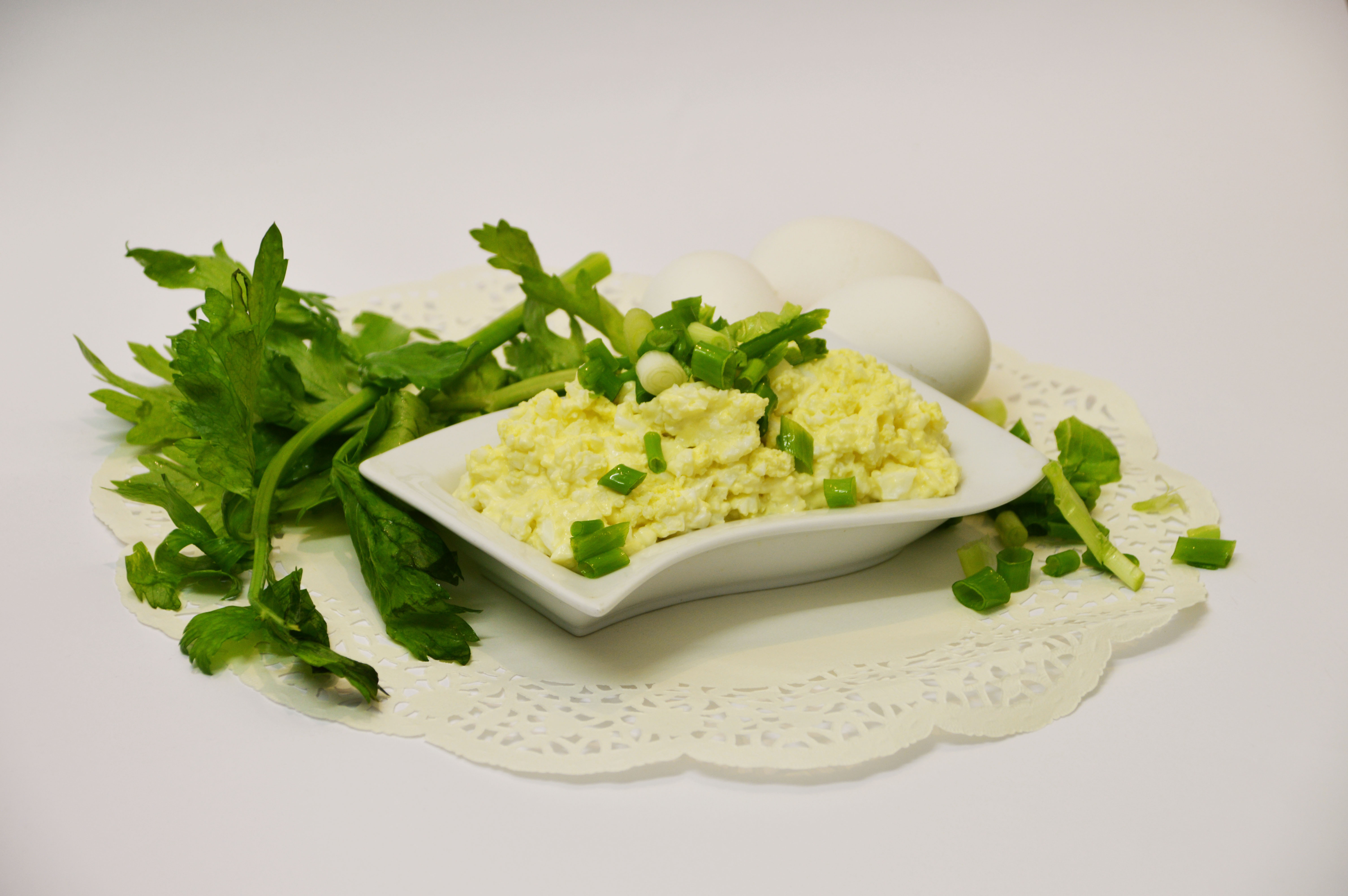
- Type: Salad
- Main ingredients: Eggs, mayonnaise, spices, herbs

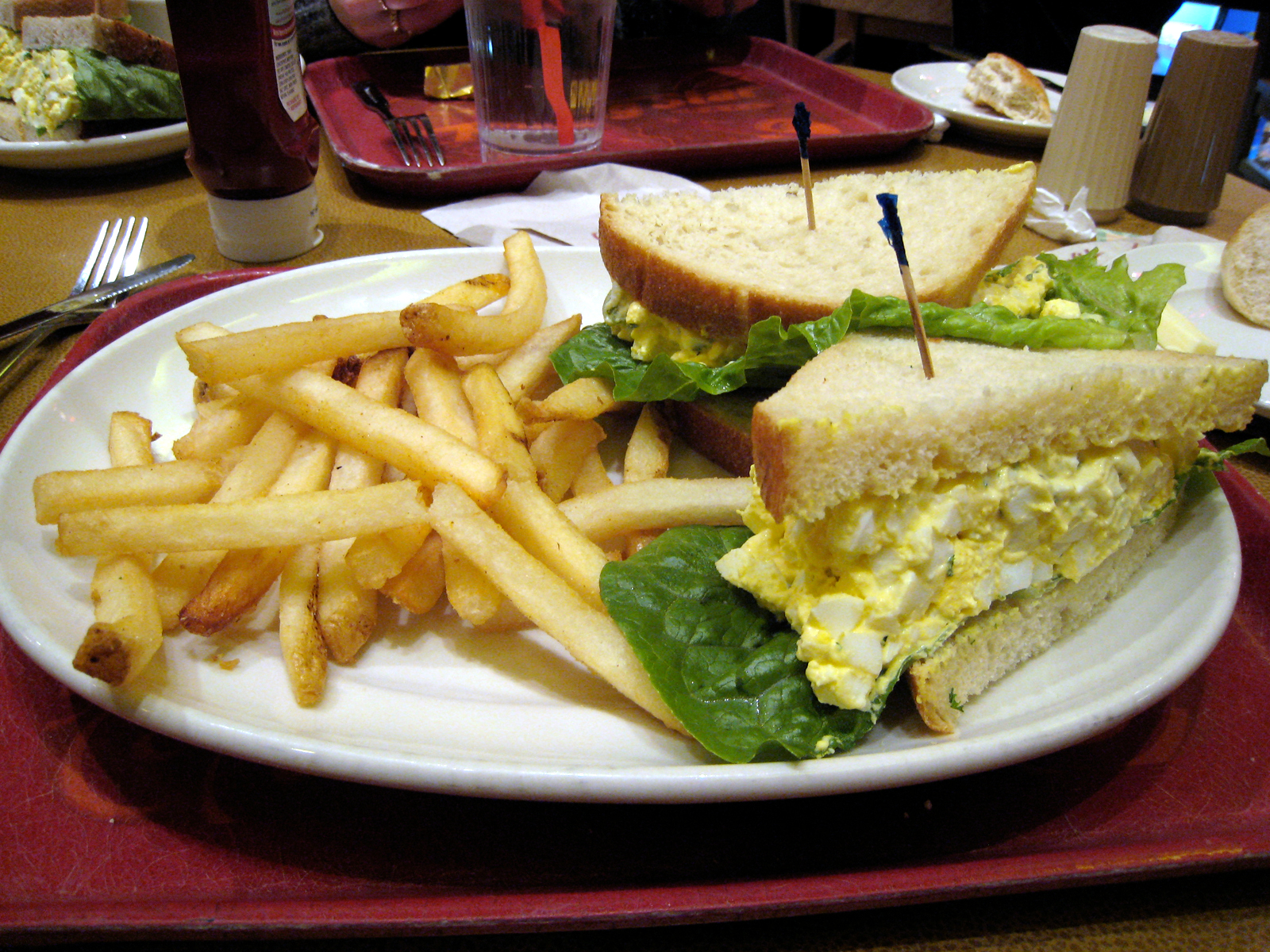
Egg salad sandwich with French fries

Egg salad is a dish consisting of chopped hard-boiled or scrambled eggs, mayonnaise, and mustard, and vegetables often including other ingredients such as celery and olives.

It is made mixed with seasonings in the form of herbs, spices and other ingredients, bound with mayonnaise. It is similar to chicken salad, ham salad, macaroni salad, tuna salad, lobster salad, and crab salad. A typical egg salad is made of chopped hard-boiled eggs, mayonnaise, mustard, minced celery and onion, salt, black pepper and paprika. A common use is as a filling for egg sandwiches. It is also often used as a topping for a green salad.

== History ==
One of the earliest known printed recipes for egg salad sandwiches was published in the 1896 edition of The Boston Cooking-School Cook Book written by Fannie Farmer.

== Variations ==
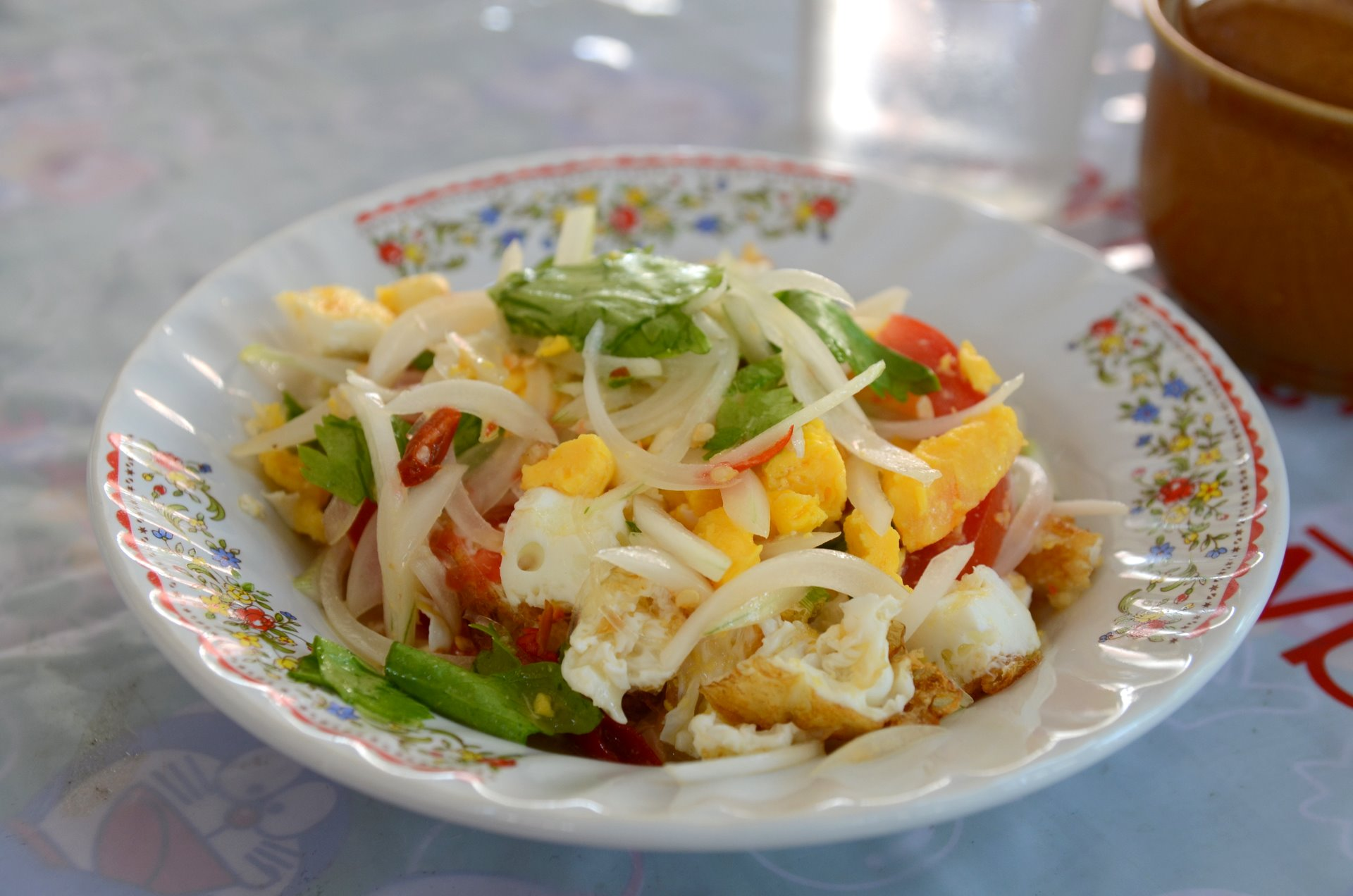
Yam khai dao: a spicy Thai salad made with fried egg

Egg salad can be made creatively with any number of other cold foods added. Bacon, bell pepper, capers, cheese, cucumber, onions, lettuce, pickle relish, pickles, and ketchup are common additional ingredients.

In Jewish cuisine it is made with schmaltz, onions and sometimes gribenes. It can be served with challah or matzah as part of the first course of Shabbat lunch. The dish is also called "Jewish eggs".

== See also ==
- Deviled egg
- Hard-boiled egg
- Oeuf mayonnaise, a dish in French cuisine
- List of egg dishes
- List of salads
- List of sandwiches
