= Willingdon Sports Club =

Private sports club in South Mumbai, India

- The club badge consists of Lord Willingdon's monogram and earl's coronet
- Named after: Lord Willingdon
- Formation: May 18, 1917; 109 years ago
- Type: Sports club
- Location: Tardeo, South Mumbai
- Coordinates: 18.9766°N 72.8153°E
- Website: willingdonclub.com

The Willingdon Sports Club is a private sports club in South Mumbai. The club was founded in 1917 by Lord Willingdon, at that time Governor of Bombay, as a club where Indians and Europeans could mix socially. Amenities include an 18-hole golf course, tennis, squash and badminton courts, a health club and a swimming pool. Non-sports amenities include a formal dining room, a semi-formal dining rooms, bar, cafés, bakery, members' provision and separate beer and wine shop, and a plant nursery.

== History ==
Lord Willingdon was appointed Governor of Bombay in 1913 with a mandate from King George V 'to smash through all fences which socially divide communities'. When Willingdon attempted to take Indian friends to the Europeans-only Royal Bombay Yacht Club and they were refused entry, the outraged Willingdon resigned his membership and in 1917 founded the Willingdon Sports Club which would have no colour bar. George V became the club's first patron and Edward, Prince of Wales, was made an honorary life member in 1921.

The club's inaugural meeting was held on 18 May 1917 at the Government Secretariat building. A 30 acre site known as the Mahalaxmi Flats was leased and opened to members on 8 December 1917. The opening was attended by Europeans and Indian aristocracy, including Daulat Singh, the Maharaja of Idar. The colour purple was Lady Willingdon's favourite colour and was chosen as the colour of the club's crest. Until 1975, purple remained the colour of the waiters' waistcoats and neckties. The club also had a garden named 'My Lady's Garden' after Lady Willingdon. The club was popular with the rulers of the Indian princely states for polo tournaments and social events during the winter season, including its horse show. The club maintained its own band and sought to hire the best jazz players.

The club's building was designed by the architect of the Bombay Improvement Trust, F. G. B. Hawkins, and included terraces, bowling greens, croquet lawns, a cricket ground, nine tennis courts, and one of the first full-size polo fields in India. The clubhouse was expanded in 1952 to include a Burmese teak staircase to a new upper veranda, red stone jali, and white Carrara marble flooring in the entrance Hall.

== Facilities ==
The club is primarily a sports club with facilities including:

- Croquet lawns
- Bowling greens
- Polo field
- Cricket field and nets
- Football pitch
- Multi-sports pitch
- Tennis courts
- Squash courts
- Padel courts
- Swimming pool
- Billiards and pool tables
- Table tennis
- Card room
- Gym

In the 21st century, there was controversy and infighting over the destruction of the badminton courts and the club election process. After the original bar was burned in a fire, the former bakery was turned into the "Pub" that functions as a mini-nightclub on weekends and "Bar Nite" once a month. The former bar is a formal, outside-catered restaurant called the "Golf View Bar" right next to the library on the upper level.

== Membership ==
Permanent membership is closed except for members' children, though temporary corporate memberships are open but mostly taken by expatriates. In the 1980s membership was temporarily opened but then later closed due to overwhelming demand. In 2007, membership was opened to members' daughters as well, much to the consternation of some members, though a majority of Balloting and Disciplinary Committee members saw it fit to admit them as "younger people spend more money." Membership applications for "ordinary members" (members' sons), corporate members and "services" (civil servants and armed forces) are decided by the Balloting and Disciplinary Committee. Indian newspaper Mid-Day wrote that the WSC has an unspoken rule that does not allow film actors and racing professionals, including jockeys, trainers and their spouses to be individuals as "actors might create a nuisance, with their followers lingering around, and ruin the ambience and peace at the club... What is important is not the profession, but the applicant's background. If the jockey is a syce's son who cannot speak seven words of English, he may be rejected." However, Akshay Khanna and his brother Rahul are members from 2010 onwards.

Due to overwhelming demand, membership has been closed since 1985 and only the children of current members, on a selective basis, can become members.

Almost all members belong to wealthy, old money families. The club is very selective in granting membership to current members' children and the applicant’s family background takes top priority along with their profession. High society members of Bombay consider Willingdon one of the most prestigious clubs in India.

== See also ==
- Eggs Kejriwal, a dish invented at the club
- List of India's gentlemen's clubs
