= Egg soda =

Drink

Egg soda (Vietnamese: soda sữa hột gà) is a sweet drink made from egg yolk, sweetened condensed milk, and club soda from Southern Vietnam, There are variations of this drink, made with different eggs but most commonly used is a quail egg. Since club soda is acidic, adding this to the egg yolk will curdle the protein. The texture of the drink can be described like a custard.

It is often canned and sold at Vietnamese or other Asian supermarkets. Egg soda can also be found freshly made at some Vietnamese restaurants.

== See also ==
- Egg coffee
- Egg cream
- Eggnog
- List of egg drinks
