= Khanom khai =

Thai dessert

Khanom khai

Khanom khai (Thai: ขนมไข่, pronounced [kʰā.nǒm kʰàj]), also known as khanom bulu (ขนมบูหลู, [kʰā.nǒm būː.lǔː]), is a Thai dessert. It is a popular Thai snack because of the size and its palatable taste. Khanom means 'dessert' and khai means 'egg'. Khanom khai is made from egg, sugar and flour. It is crispy on the outside and soft on the inside. The taste of the dessert is similar to cake, whereas its texture is rougher because of the different types of flour and the different proportion of ingredients. Traditional khanom khai has the scent of egg after baking in charcoal stove.

The origin of khanom khai in Thailand has not been proved, yet. However, it is thought to be first well known in Southern area since the dessert is sometimes called "khanom khai of Phuket" (Phuket is a province in Southern Thailand). In addition, the word bulu derives from Malayu. It is also said that "the dessert has the very first origin in Malaysia but the exact time is unknown. Then, it was inherited to the next generation until now."

Khanom khai has now spread and been eaten widely all over Thailand since it is easy to eat and costs inexpensive price. Khanom Khai is also popular in religious festivals both Buddhism and Islam; for example, in Buddhism's Sat Thai and Islam's Hari Raya festival (History of Traditional Khanom Khai, 2013). Some Thai-Chinese people also serve khanom khai in their wedding day because it is believed to be a fortune dessert. The rising of the dessert after baking implies the rise of married life. It means to bless the couple to have a happy and flourish life together after the marriage.

== See also ==
- List of egg dishes
