= Huevo =

Huevo is the Spanish-language translation of the word "egg", but can also be vulgarly used as a Spanish slang term for "testicle".

Huevo(s) may also refer to:

== Food ==
- Chorizo con huevos, a popular Mexican dish consisting of fried chorizo with scrambled eggs
- Huevos motuleños, a Mexican dish that originated from Motul, Yucatán
- Huevos pericos, a Colombian/Venezuelan dish
- Huevos rancheros, another Mexican dish served during breakfast
- Machacado con huevo, or "Huevos con machaca", a dish of scrambled eggs mixed with machaca that's said to have originated from Ciénega de Flores
- Shakshouka, a Maghrebi dish also called "Huevos a la flamenca"
- Torta de huevo, a torta filled with scrambled eggs

== Entertainment ==
- Golden Balls (film), or "Huevos de oro", a 1993 Spanish film
- Huevos (album), a studio album created by Meat Puppets
- Huevos (film series), a series of animated films produced in Mexico, produced by Huevocartoon
  - Otra Película de Huevos y un Pollo, a 2009 animated film
  - Una Película de Huevos, a 2006 animated film
  - Un gallo con muchos huevos, a 2015 animated film
  - Un rescate de huevitos, a 2021 animated film
- Huevos Rancheros (band), a former Canadian indie rock band which were active from 1990 to 2000

== Other ==
- Huevos (island), an island in the Republic of Trinidad and Tobago
- Manolo Cabeza de Huevo, a series of famous Spanish prank calls by the radio show El Vacilón de la Mañana
