= Telur gulung =

Indonesian snacks

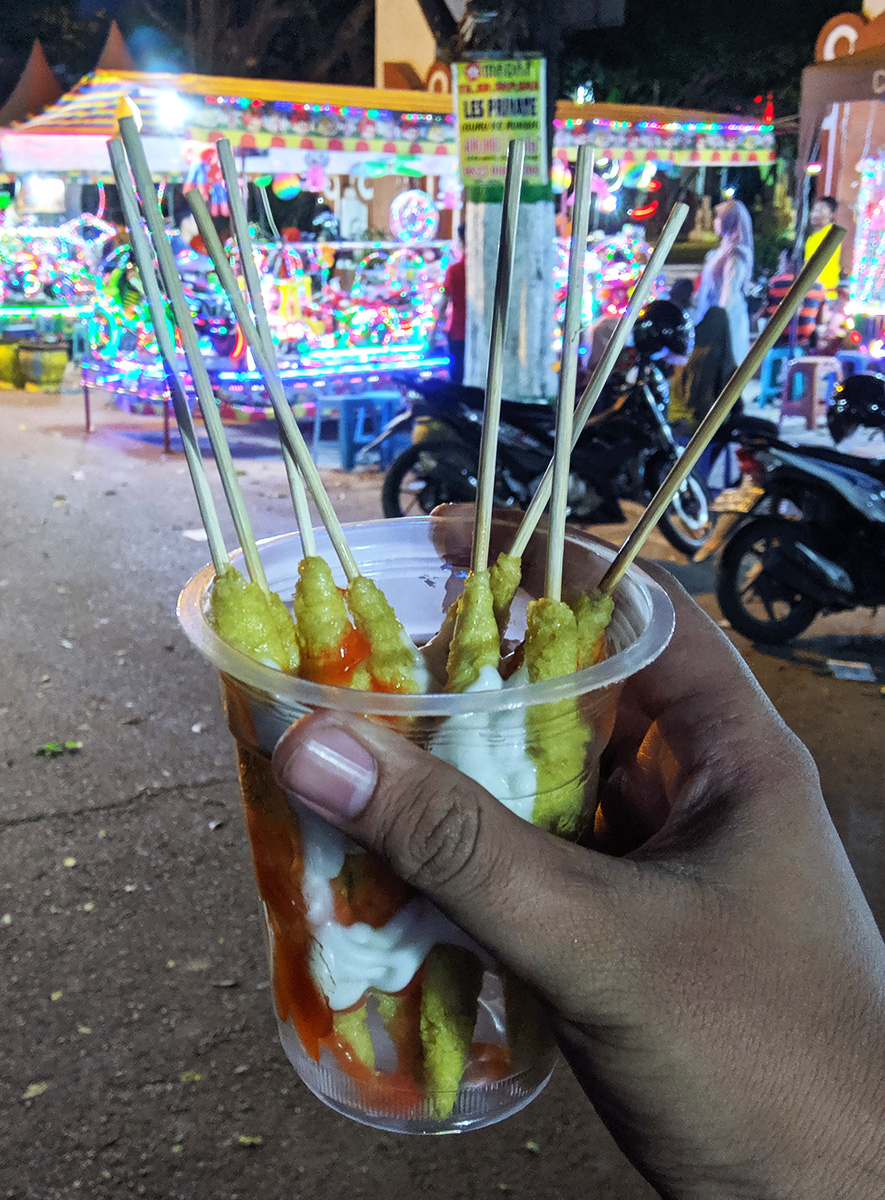
- Telur gulung with mayonnaise and hot sauce
- Course: Snack
- Region or state: Java, Indonesia
- Serving temperature: Hot
- Main ingredients: Egg

Telur gulung (Indonesian for 'rolled egg') is a traditional Indonesian food in which an egg is fried into an omelet and then rolled using a skewer which is usually made of bamboo. This food is often served and sold by street vendors in front of schools. Telur gulung is a legendary snack because it has been around since the 90s.
