= Shirred eggs =

Egg dish

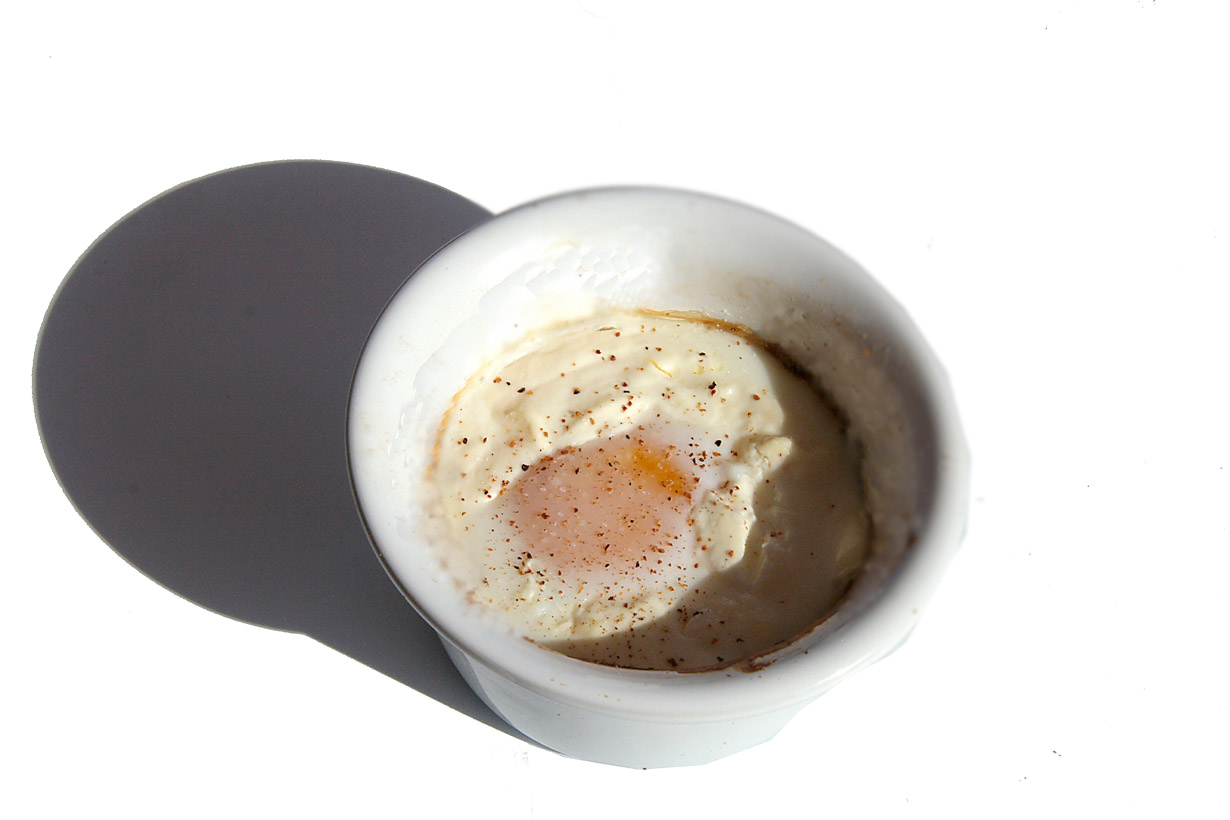
- Alternative names: Baked eggs Œufs cocotte
- Place of origin: France
- Main ingredients: Eggs
- Variations: Eggs en cocotte

Shirred eggs, also known as baked eggs, are eggs that have been baked in a flat-bottomed dish; the name originates from the type of dish in which they were traditionally baked. Shirred eggs are considered a simple and reliable dish that can be easily varied and expanded upon. An alternative way of cooking is to crack the eggs into individual ramekins, and cook them in a bain-marie, as coddled eggs.

== Description ==
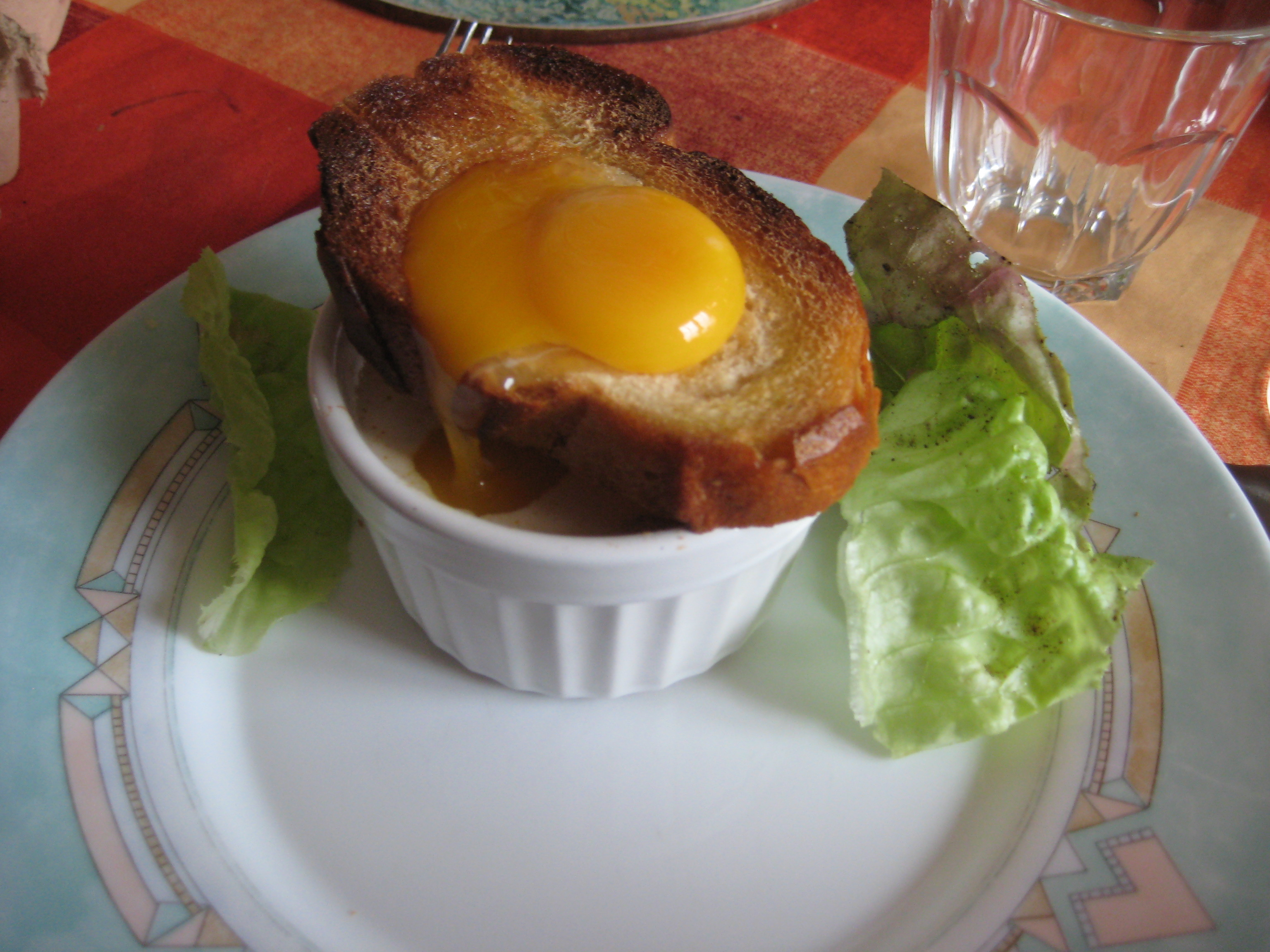
Œufs cocotte à la provençale

Shirred eggs are eggs that have been baked in a gratin dish with a flat bottom. Traditionally, they have been cooked in a dish called a shirrer, from which the dish gets its name, but the name now applies regardless of the type of dish in which they are baked. They are typically baked simply with butter until the whites have set and the yolks are thickened, and are usually served in the dish in which they were baked.

The egg is commonly covered with a small amount of cream before baking. Variations on the recipe include adding breadcrumbs or cheese to the top of the eggs to create a crust, or garnishing with herbs such as tarragon. Adding a protein such as fish to the dish has also been suggested by chefs to round it out sufficiently to make it suitable as a dinner-time option. Another variation suggested by the United States Department of Agriculture during the 1920s was to break the eggs into a bed of cooked rice and cover them in cheese sauce.

Shirred eggs have also been compared to eggs Benedict; chef James Ramsden has described them as a more reliable and simpler recipe.

== See also ==
- List of egg dishes
