= Eggs and brains =

Portuguese breakfast dish

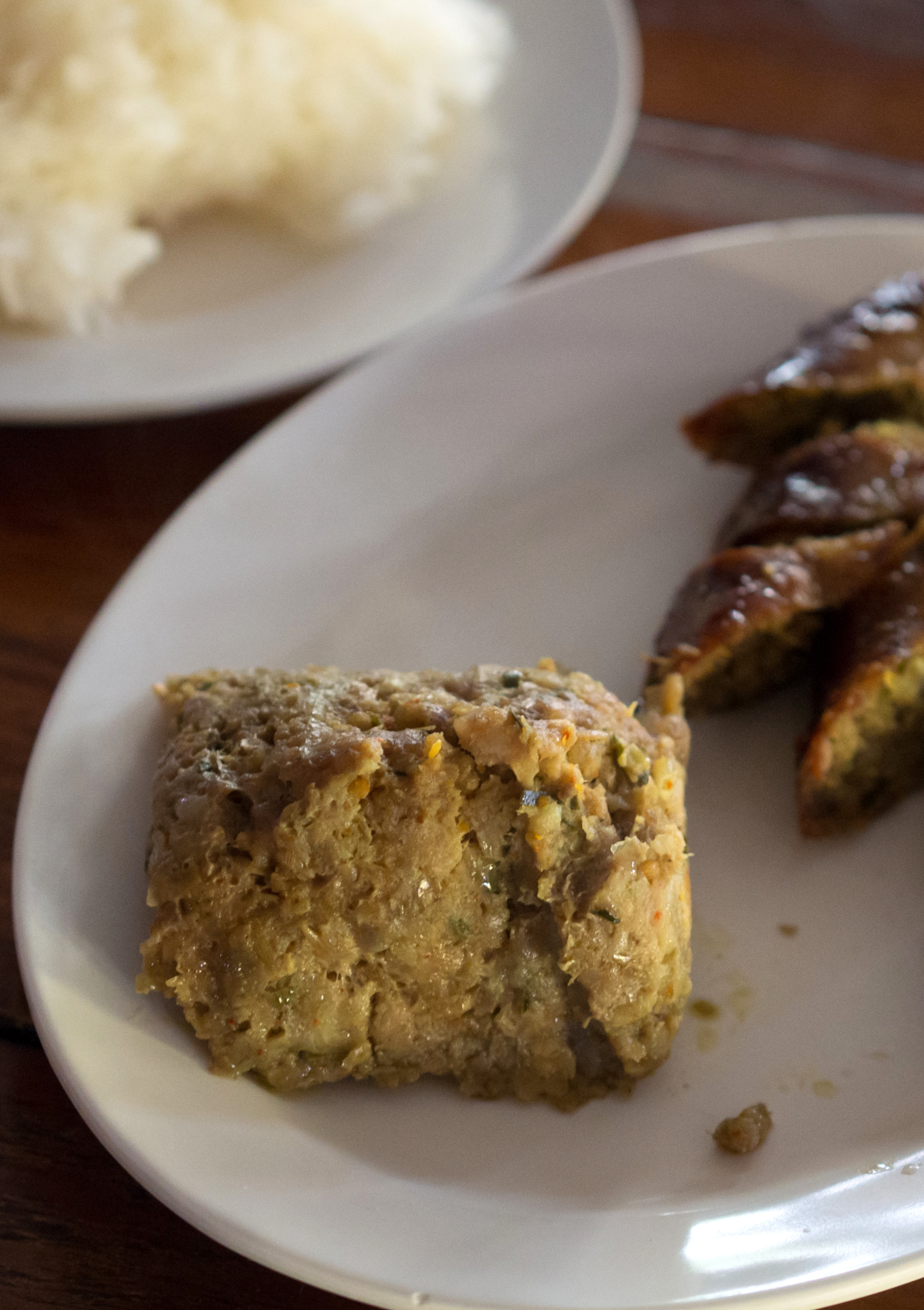
Roughly chopped pig's brain mixed with egg and curry paste

Eggs and brains is a breakfast meal consisting of pork brains (or those of another mammal) and scrambled eggs. It is a dish of Portuguese cuisine known as omolete de mioleira (English: brain omelette). In Austria, the dish is known as Hirn mit Ei ("calf's brain with eggs") and used to be very common, but has seen a sharp drop in popularity.

== In the United States ==
In the American Midwest, the components in the name are reversed, and it is called "brains and eggs". It is also a breakfast dish in the cuisine of the Southern United States and has also been served as a lunch dish.

== See also ==
- Brain sandwich
- List of egg dishes
