= Oeuf mayonnaise =

French egg dish

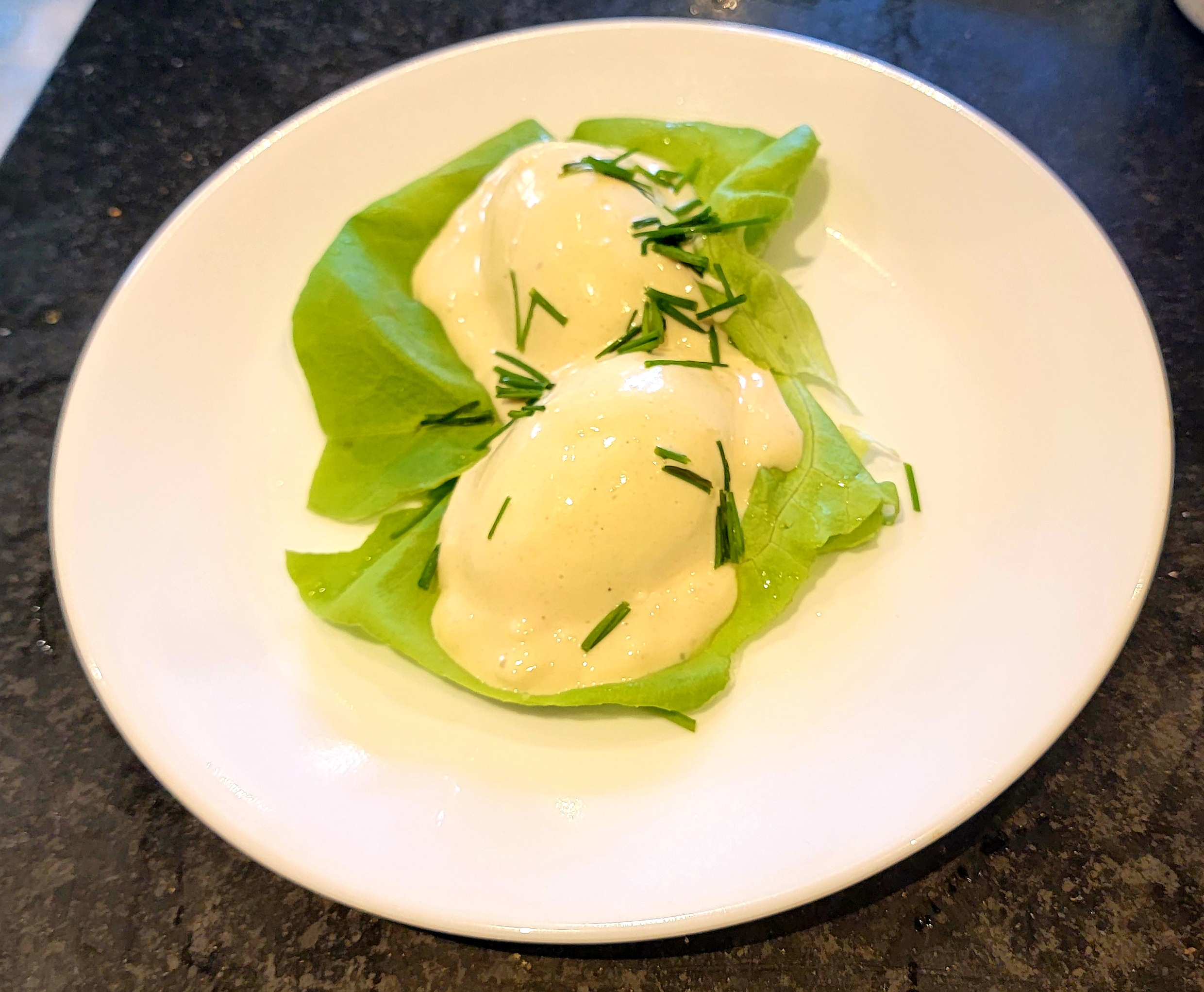
Oeuf mayonnaise on lettuce, garnished with chives

Oeuf mayonnaise, sometimes shortened to oeuf mayo, is a simple French egg dish. It is an hors d'oeuvre and is considered a classic bistro dish. A recipe was included in the 1936 cookbook L'Art culinaire moderne by Henri-Paul Pellaprat, which was first translated for American cooks in 1966 as Modern French Culinary Art.

== Preparation ==
A serving consists of a large chicken egg, which is almost hard-boiled, although it is removed from the heat while the yolk retains a little creaminess. The egg is then chilled, peeled and halved lengthwise. The halves are presented face down on a plate, resembling white domes. Then, the egg halves are entirely covered with a sauce consisting of mayonnaise and Dijon mustard, thinned with enough water or lemon juice that it can be poured with a spoon.

== Presentation ==
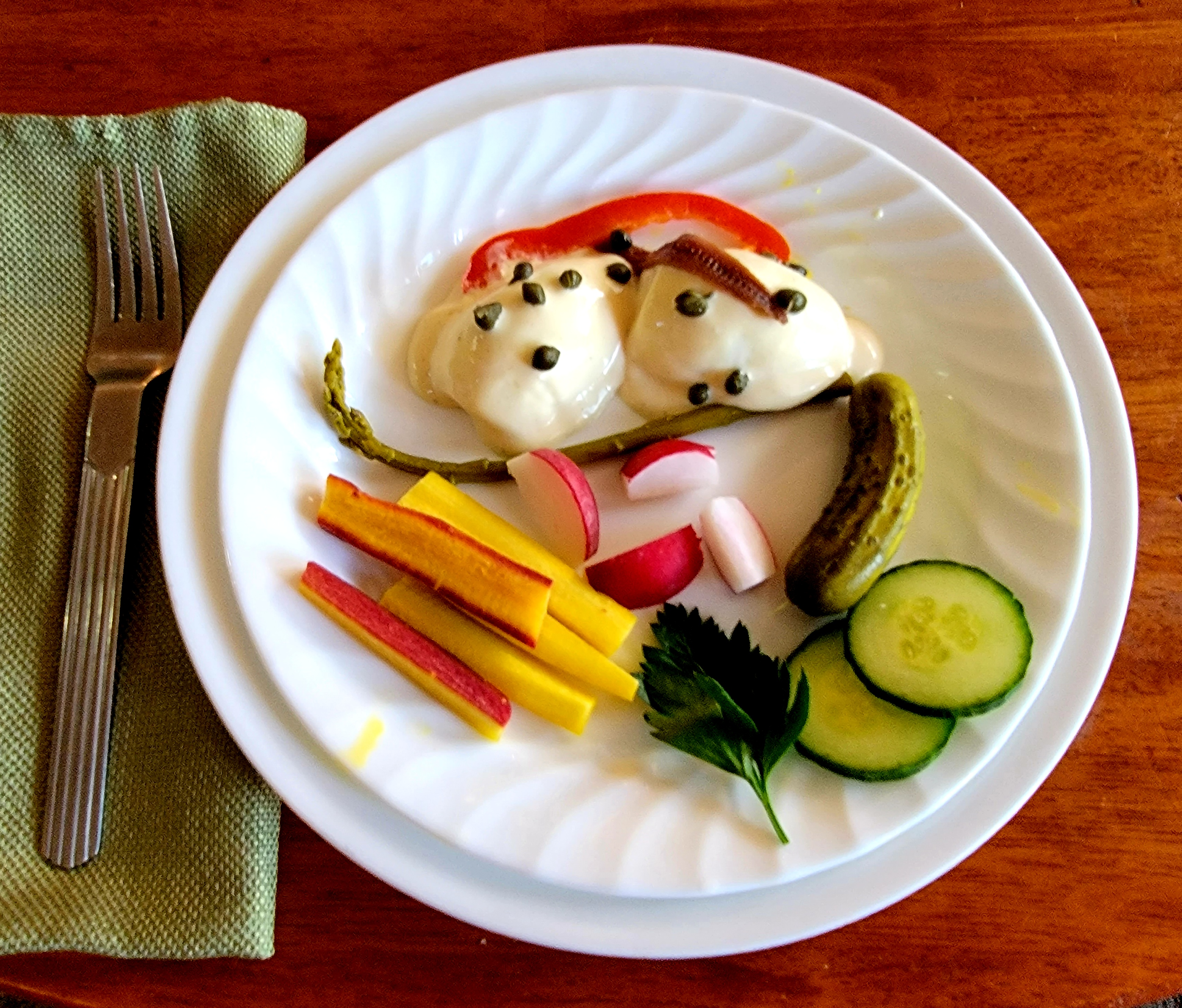
Oeuf mayonnaise with crudités, capers and an anchovy fillet

The dish is served either on a leaf of lettuce, or with crudités on the side. It can be garnished with snipped chives, parsley, chervil, fried capers, thin-sliced, roasted red bell pepper or an anchovy fillet.

== Preservation ==
In the late 1980s, the dish was going out of fashion in Paris, perhaps in part due to concern about eggs being a high-cholesterol food. In 1990, Claude Lebey, author of several restaurant guides, founded a group that he called the Association de sauvegarde de l’oeuf mayonnaise to promote the dish and its proper preparation. Lebey claimed that bistros in the 1980s were "losing their wings" and that oeuf mayonnaise was an "emblematic recipe" which "is as indispensable to the cuisine as the paperclip is to office work." Lebey commented "Oeuf mayonnaise cannot be explained. It must be savored."

Lebey retired in 2013 and died in 2017. His grandson, Vincent Brenot, is keeping the organization going. Brenot says that the dish "looks very simple, but is actually quite complex to do if you want to make it extremely good", adding that "the length of the cooking of the egg is also of the essence."

Cookbook writers like Elizabeth David and chefs like Joël Robuchon and Alice Waters are advocates for oeuf mayonnaise.

== See also ==
- List of egg dishes
