= Egg sandwich =

Sandwich with some kind of egg filling

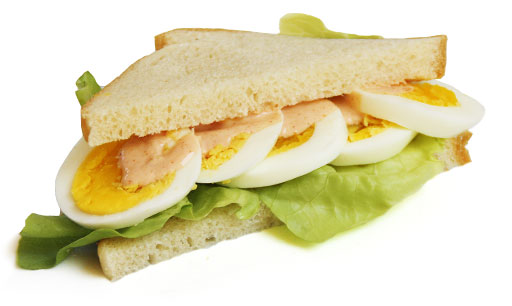
- An egg sandwich, with lettuce
- Type: Sandwich
- Main ingredients: Bread, eggs (fried eggs, scrambled eggs, boiled eggs or egg salad)

An egg sandwich is a sandwich with a cooked egg filling. Fried eggs, scrambled eggs, omelette, sliced boiled eggs and egg salad (a mix of chopped cooked egg and mustard and mayonnaise) are popular options. In the last case, it is called an egg salad sandwich.

== History of egg sandwiches ==
=== Fried egg sandwich ===
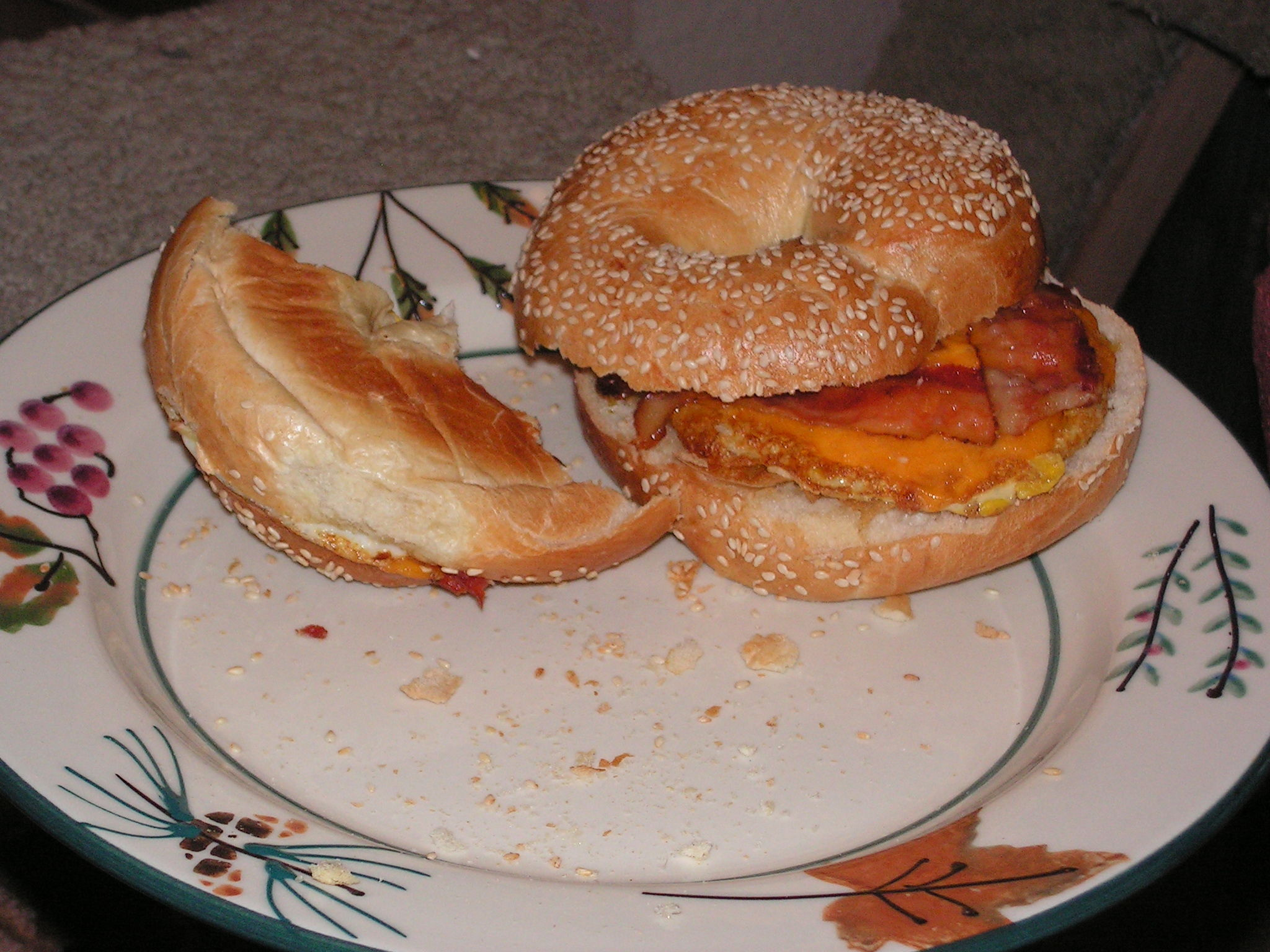
Fried-egg over hard, with bacon and cheese, on a sesame bagel

Beyond the basic model of fried egg between slices of bread, many common sandwiches have variations that include a fried egg in addition to bacon, sausage, cheese, black pudding, lunch meats, or as another topping to a hamburger. A popular breakfast sandwich in New Jersey consists of a fried egg, pork roll, and American cheese on a roll. The Southern egg sandwich is an egg and cheese sandwich, with bacon and avocado as additions.

A popular filling snack with British troops since at least World War I, the "egg banjo" is a sandwich of a runny fried egg between two thick slices of bread (if possible, buttered or with margarine), often accompanied by a mug of "gunfire" (a drink of tea and rum). A popular account of the term's origins is the act of cleaning spilt egg off one's body, the sandwich held out to the side with one hand whilst the other wipes at the drips, giving the impression of playing an invisible banjo.

=== Boiled egg sandwich ===
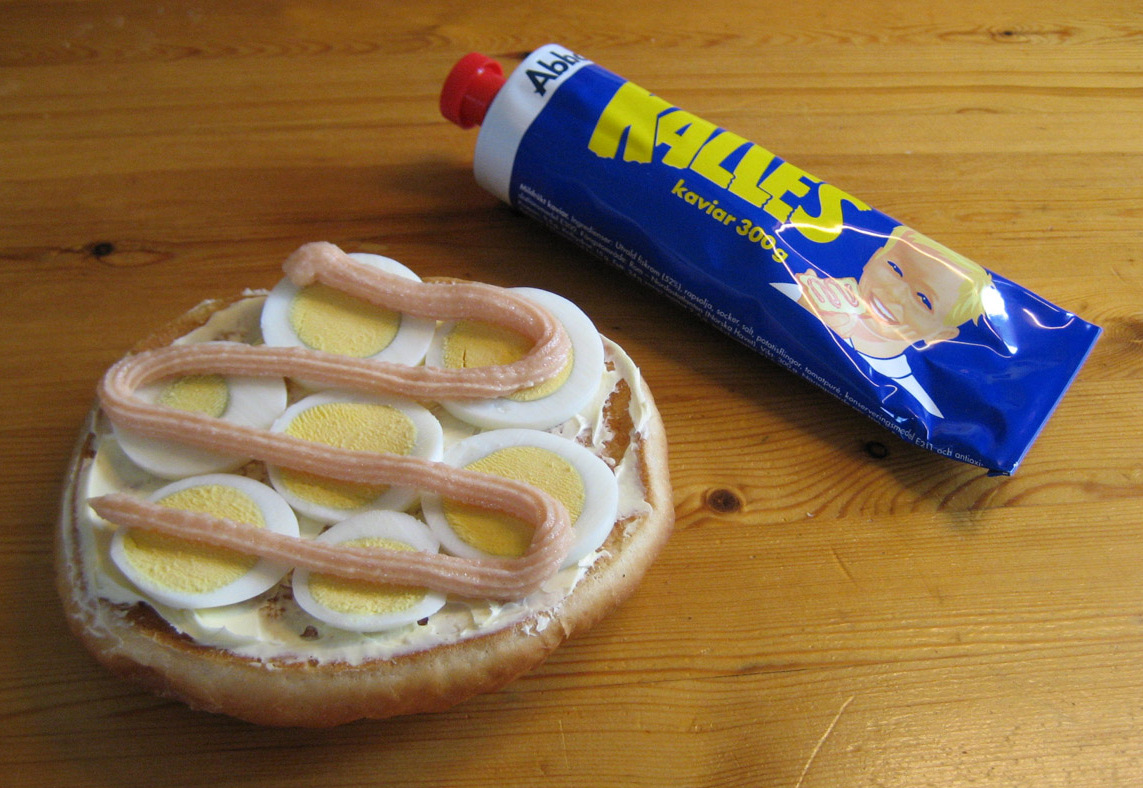
A sandwich with sliced boiled egg and kaviar.

A 1905 British cookbook describes an "egg sandwich" made with sliced hard-boiled eggs, marinated in oil, vinegar, salt, and black pepper, and garnished with minced watercress. An "egg and chutney sandwich" is made from chutney and minced hard-boiled eggs; an "egg cream" sandwich from hard-boiled eggs pounded into a smooth paste and seasoned with anchovies and mustard. A common alternative is to mash the hard-boiled egg together with mayonnaise, mustard, salt and black pepper, usually called simply egg spread, or an egg mayonnaise or egg mayo. This is similar to egg salad. Curried egg sandwiches, which add a mild curry powder to the mayonnaise are common in Australia. Cress is often seen as the typical accompaniment to an egg sandwich. Salad cream is also a common alternative to mayonnaise, mainly within the UK. This simple sandwich of mayonnaise and boiled egg is popular in Japan as "Tamago sando" (egg sandwich). In Scandinavia and Finland, boiled egg and kaviar is a common topping on sandwiches.

=== Egg salad sandwich ===
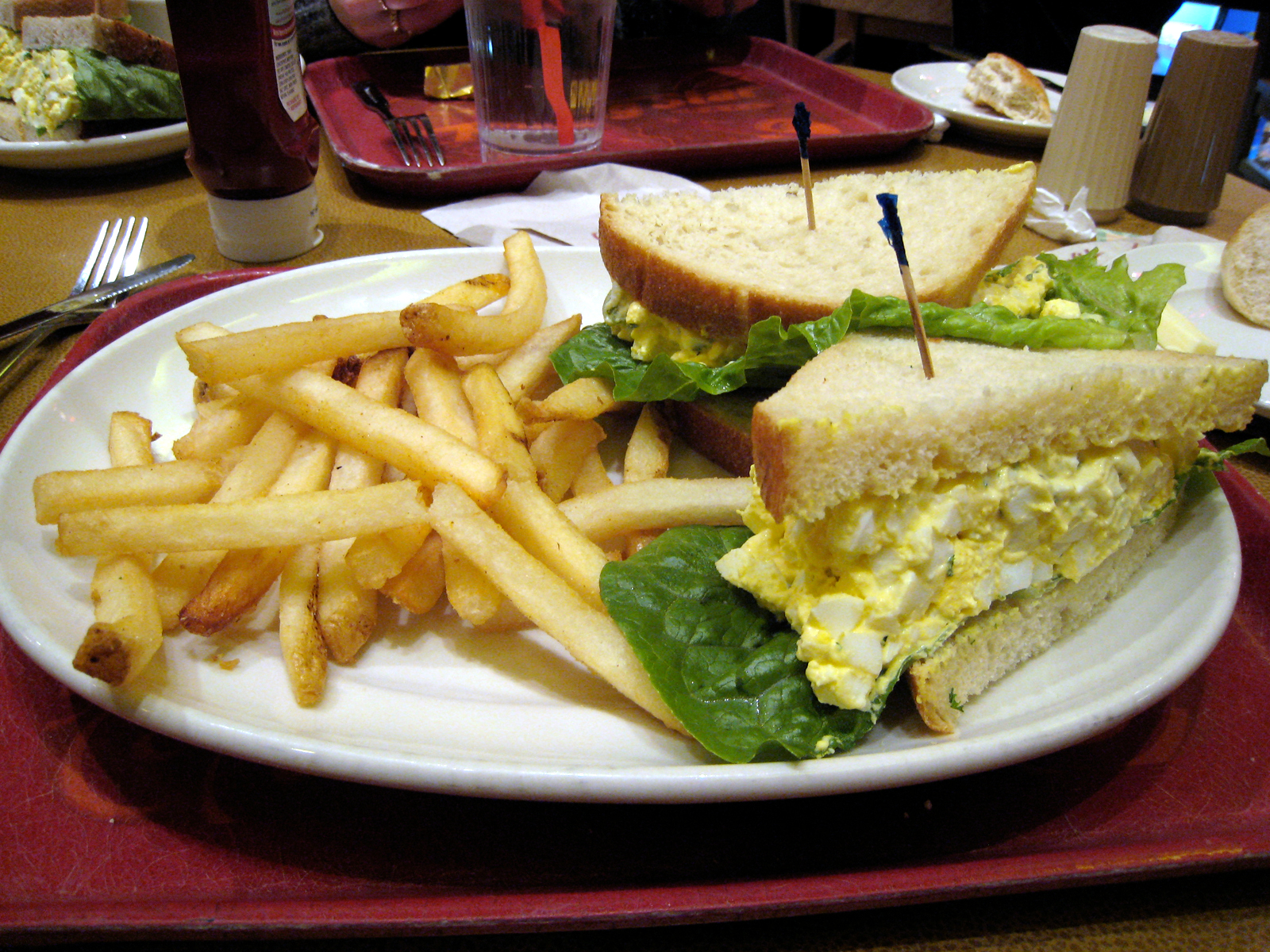
An egg salad sandwich with french fries

It is also common to use egg salad as a sandwich filling in both North America and Asia: the egg salad sandwich is a signature item in Japanese 7-Eleven stores.

== History as fast food ==
Prompted by meat rationing during World War II, manager Bruce LaPlante introduced the first fast food egg dish with a fried egg sandwich at a St. Louis White Castle. However, the dish was unpopular, and was abandoned as soon as wartime meat rationing was lifted. Fast food restaurants did not begin serving egg dishes again until the 1970s, starting with the McDonald's McMuffin, invented in 1971 by McDonald's franchisee Herb Peterson in Santa Barbara, California.

== See also ==
- Eggs Benedict, a form of open-faced egg sandwich
- Denver sandwich
- Creamed eggs on toast
- McMuffin, a popular fast-food breakfast egg sandwich
- Breakfast sandwich, a general article about sandwiches served at breakfast, including the egg sandwich
- List of egg dishes
- List of sandwiches
