= Bai pong moan =

Cambodian soup

- Place of origin: Cambodia
- Region or state: Southeast Asia
- Associated cuisine: Cambodian cuisine
- Serving temperature: hot
- Main ingredients: fried eggs and white rice
- Ingredients generally used: herbs, salt, soy sauce, or fish sauce
- Variations: bai pong moan kralok, bai pong moan mul, pong moan bampong

Bai pong moan (Khmer: បាយពងមាន់, bay pông moăn [baːj pɔːŋ mŏən], lit. ''rice and chicken eggs'') is a Cambodian dish consisting of fried eggs and white rice. Beaten eggs are preferred and herbs are often added for flavor. Unbeaten eggs are usually cooked until crisp on one side and somewhat raw on the other side. Salt, soy sauce, or fish sauce can be used to flavor the eggs, and soy sauce can also be applied to the rice.

Bai pong moan can be served with congee.

== Variations ==
- Bai pong moan kralok (បាយពងមាន់ក្រឡុក, bay pông moăn krâlŏk) - Beaten eggs with a choice of varieties of herbs, served with rice but usually without soy sauce
- Bai pong moan mul (បាយពងមាន់មូល, bay pông moăn mul) - Unbeaten eggs cooked until crisp, yolk kept raw. This variation is eaten mainly with soy sauce and rice.
- Pong moan bampong (ពងមាន់បំពង, pông moăn bâmpông) - Deep-fried eggs eaten as a snack, generally without rice.
