= Khai yat sai =

Thai egg dish

- Place of origin: Thailand
- Region or state: Southeast Asia
- Associated cuisine: Thailand

Khai yat sai or kai yat sai (Thai: ไข่ยัดไส้, RTGS: khai yat sai, pronounced [kʰàj ját sâj]) is a type of Thai omelette. The name means 'stuffed eggs'. The egg is cooked lightly, topped with various ingredients (such as minced beef or pork, peas, onion, spring onion, carrots, tomatoes), seasoned with fish sauce or oyster sauce, and then folded over. The dish can be prepared as a main course or side dish.

== See also ==
- List of stuffed dishes
