= Creamed eggs on toast =

American breakfast dish

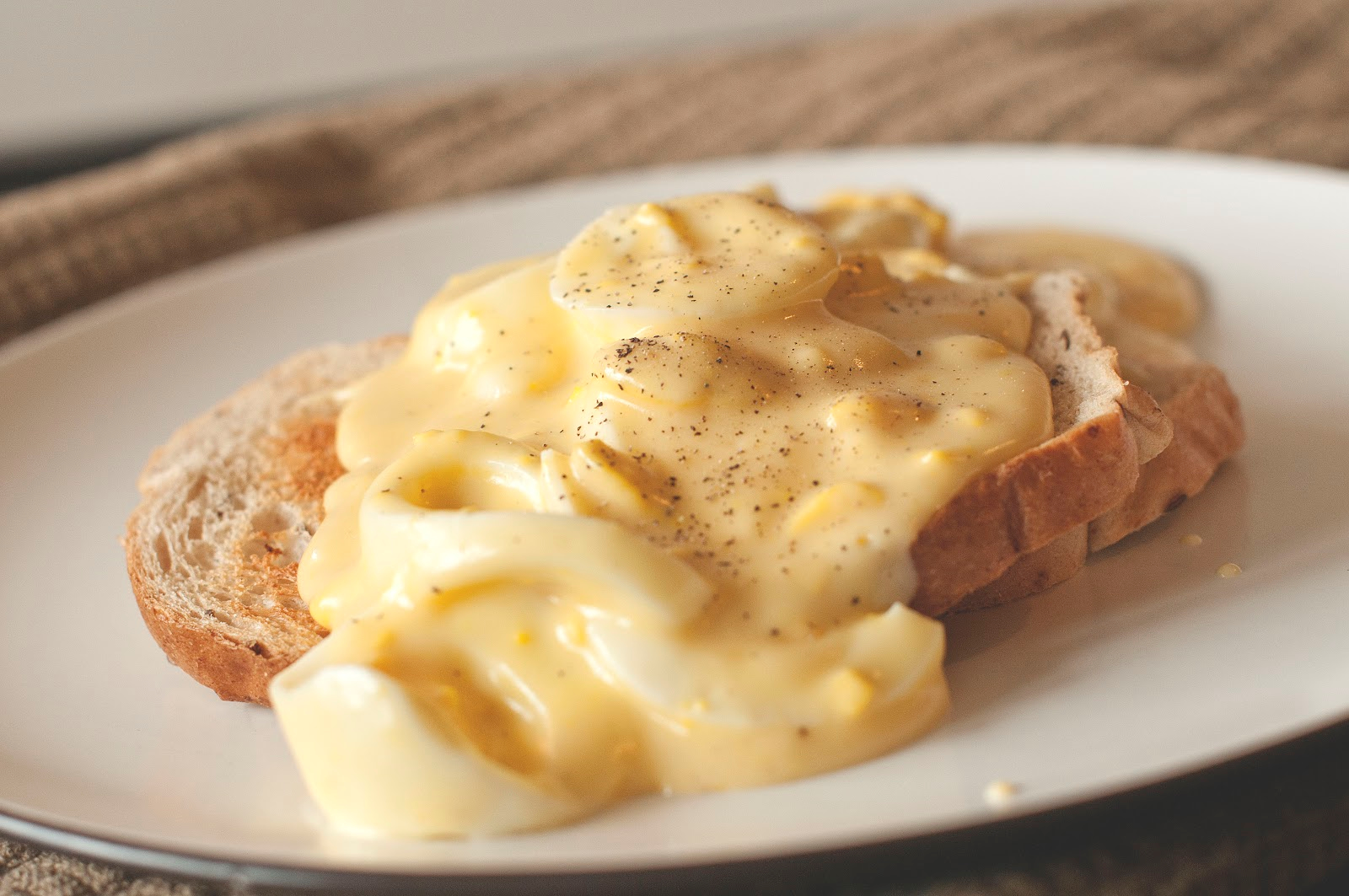
- Creamed eggs on toast, an American breakfast
- Course: Breakfast
- Place of origin: United States
- Region or state: South, Midwest
- Serving temperature: Warm
- Main ingredients: Hard-boiled eggs, cream sauce
- Ingredients generally used: Toast
- Variations: Creamed eggs on a biscuit

Creamed eggs on toast is an American breakfast dish. It consists of toast or biscuits covered in a gravy made from béchamel sauce and chopped hard-boiled eggs. The gravy is often flavored with various seasonings, such as black pepper, garlic powder, celery salt, Worcestershire sauce, sherry, chopped parsley and/or chopped chives. The Joy of Cooking recommends making the bechamel with 1/2 cream and 1/2 chicken stock and adding capers or chopped pickle. As with many other dishes covered in light-colored sauce, a sprinkle of paprika or cayenne is often added as decoration.

The dish is sometimes used as a way to use up leftovers. Common additions include chopped ham, veal, chicken, lobster, cooked asparagus and peas.

Variations include Eggs Goldenrod, made by reserving the yolks and sprinkling them over the dish after the cream sauce has been poured on the toast, and Eggs à la Bechamel, substituting croutons fried in butter for the toast and poached or soft-boiled eggs for the hard-boiled eggs. In this case, the cooked eggs are placed on the croutons and the sauce poured over both.

Another variation is Eggs a la tripe, in which the eggs are covered with bechamel sauce and served with fried croutons as a garnish.

In many families, this dish has become a traditional Easter brunch fare. The 1896 edition of Fanny Farmer's Boston Cooking-School Cook Book contains a recipe for creamed eggs and toast.

== See also ==
- Biscuits and gravy
- List of bread dishes
- List of egg dishes
- List of toast dishes
