= Egg in the basket =

Egg fried in a hole in a slice of bread

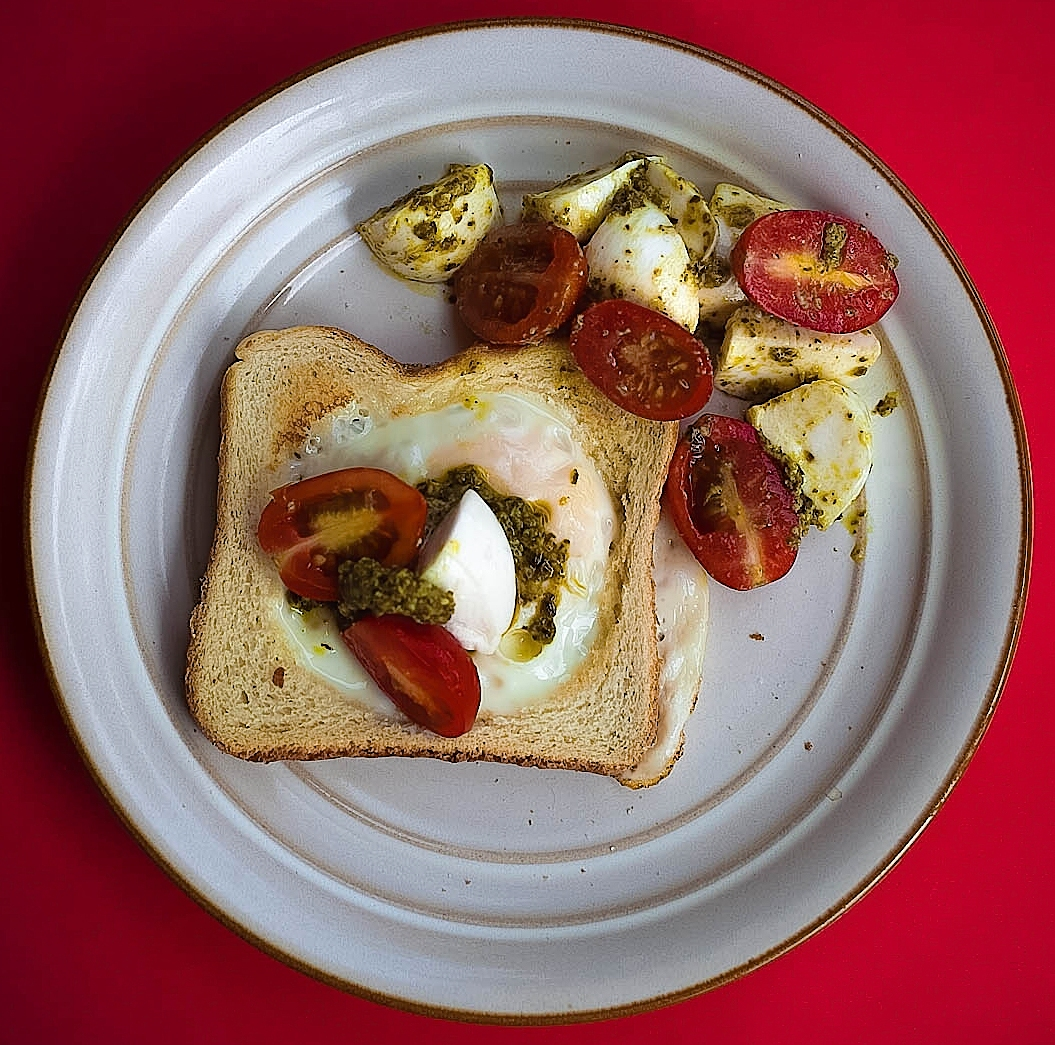
- Egg in the basket with tomato, fresh mozzarella, and pesto
- Main ingredients: Bread, eggs

Egg in the basket, which is also known by many other names, is an egg fried in a hole in a slice of bread.

== Description ==
The dish consists of a slice of bread with an egg in the middle, fried with butter or oil. It is commonly prepared by cutting a circular or square hole in the center of a piece of bread, which may be buttered. The bread is fried in a pan with butter, margarine, cooking oil, or other fat. At some point, an egg is cracked into the hole in the bread. When the egg is added to the bread determines how well-done the egg and bread will be relative to each other in the final product. The pan may be covered or the bread flipped while on the heat to obtain even cooking. A waffle or bagel (with a large enough hole) can be substituted for the slice of bread.

Scrambled egg in the basket served with its "hat" or "lid"

== Names and origins ==
A recipe for "egg with a hat" appeared in Fannie Farmer's Boston Cooking School Cookbook in the 1890s. Italian immigrants to the US cooked a similar dish called uova fritte nel pane.

There are many names for the dish. Some discussions include as many as a dozen, and one writer reported finding "close to one hundred".

The name toad in the hole is sometimes used for this dish, though that name more commonly refers to sausages cooked in Yorkshire pudding batter.

The dish has made many appearances in film and television. The dish is also known as Guy Kibbee eggs, due to its preparation by actor Guy Kibbee in the 1935 Warner Bros film Mary Jane's Pa. In the 1941 film Moon Over Miami, it is prepared by Betty Grable's character and referred to as "gashouse eggs". It was also featured in the 1987 film Moonstruck, the 2005 film V for Vendetta, and a 1996 episode of Friends.

Author Roald Dahl wrote numerous times of his fondness for the dish, which he referred to as hot-house eggs.

== See also ==
- French toast
- Fried egg
- Khachapuri
- List of bread dishes
- List of egg dishes
- List of toast dishes
