= Strata (food) =

American egg dish

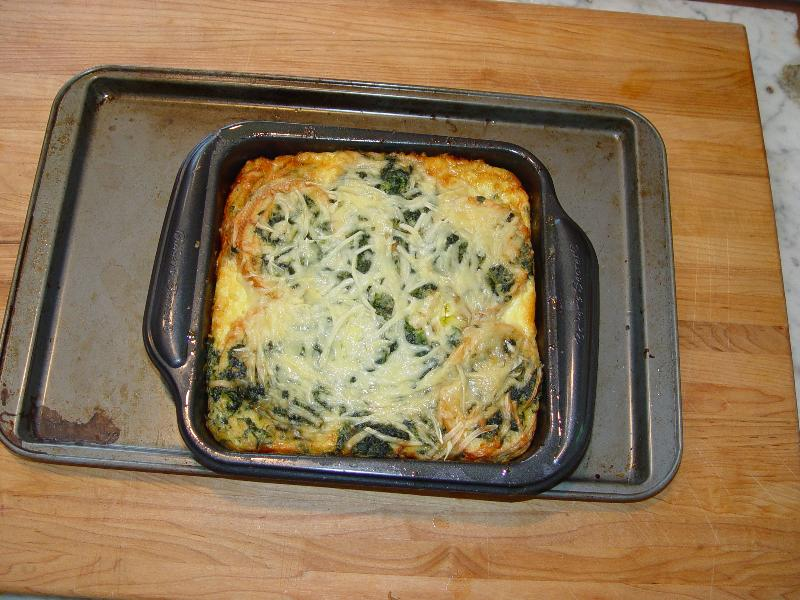
Breakfast strata

Strata is a family of layered casserole dishes in American cuisine.

The most common modern variant is a brunch dish, made from a mixture which mainly consists of bread, eggs and cheese. It may also include meat or vegetables. The usual preparation requires the bread to be layered with the filling in order to produce layers (strata). It was popularized in the 1984 Silver Palate Good Times Cookbook by Julee Rosso and Sheila Lukins. The first known recipe, the cheese strata, dates back to 1902 and contains bread, white sauce and cheese.

Other recipes merely require that the ingredients are mixed together, like a savory bread pudding. A beaten egg mixture is then poured over the ingredients. It is served warm.

== See also ==
- List of egg dishes
