= Eggs Benedict =

American breakfast or brunch dish

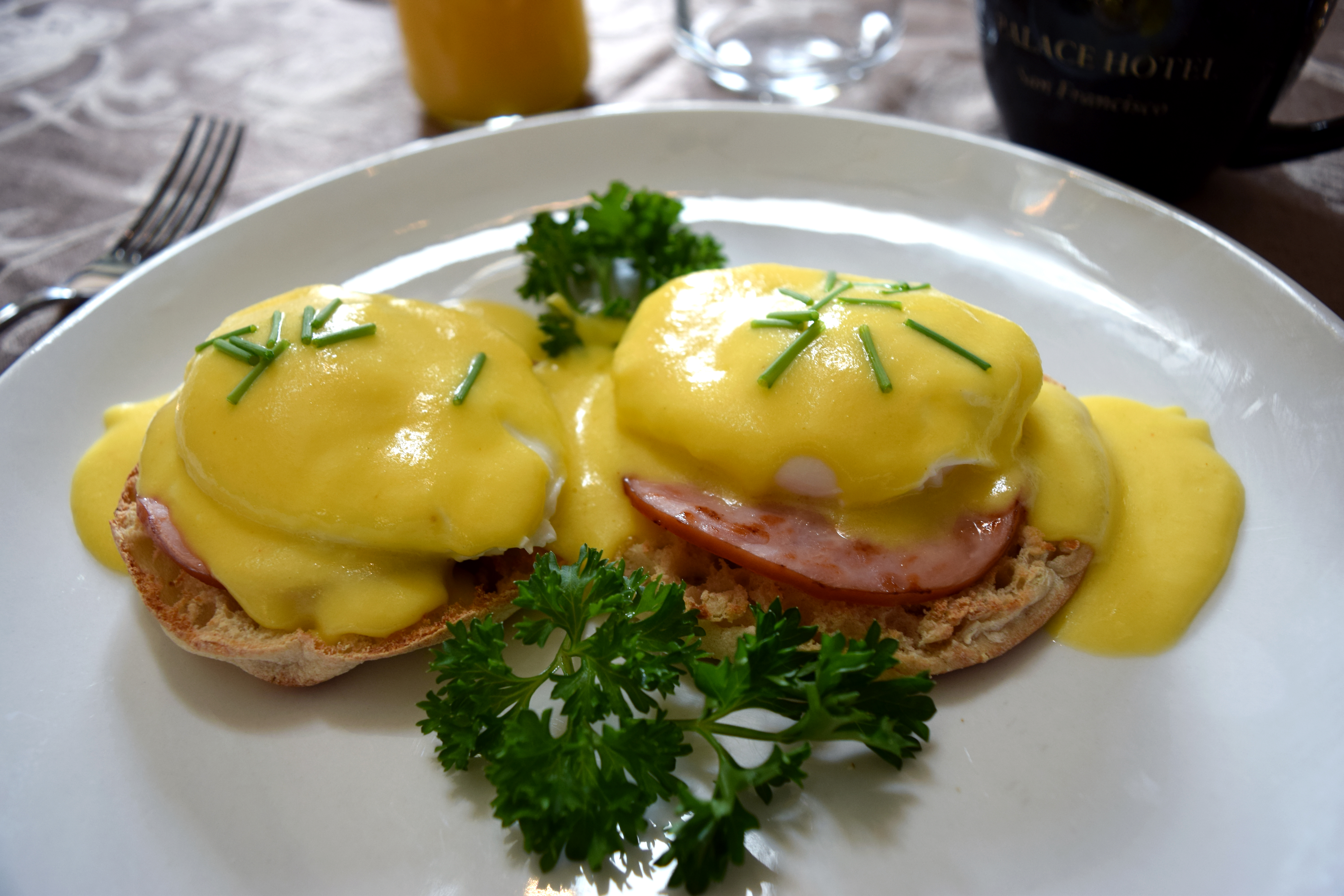
- Eggs Benedict with Canadian bacon on an English muffin with Hollandaise sauce
- Course: Breakfast, brunch
- Place of origin: United States
- Region or state: New York City
- Main ingredients: English muffin, bacon or ham, poached eggs, Hollandaise sauce
- Variations: Multiple

Eggs Benedict is a common American breakfast or brunch dish, consisting of two halves of an English muffin, each topped with Canadian bacon or sliced ham, a poached egg, and hollandaise sauce. The dish is believed to have originated in New York City, although a number of different origin stories exist.

== Origin and history ==
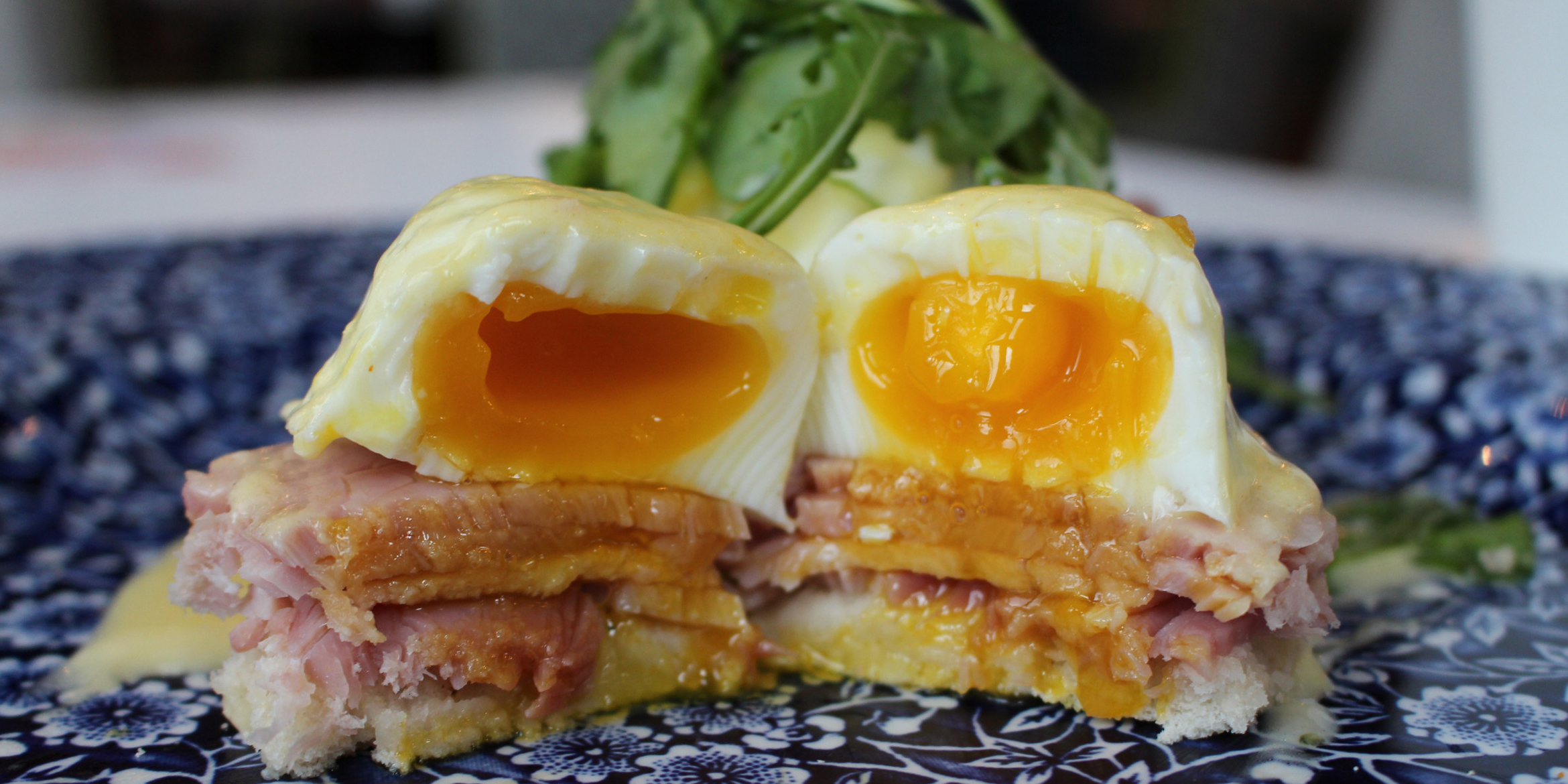
The cross section of a serving of eggs Benedict

There are multiple conflicting accounts as to the origin of eggs Benedict.

Delmonico's in Lower Manhattan says on its menu that "Eggs Benedict was first created in our ovens in 1860." One of its former chefs, Charles Ranhofer, also published the recipe for Eggs à la Benedick in 1920.

In an interview recorded in the "Talk of the Town" column of The New Yorker in 1942, the year before his death, Lemuel Benedict, a retired Wall Street stock broker, said that he had wandered into the Waldorf Hotel in 1894 and, hoping to find a cure for his morning hangover, ordered "buttered toast, poached eggs, crisp bacon, and a hooker of hollandaise". Oscar Tschirky, the maître d'hôtel, was so impressed with the dish that he put it on the breakfast and luncheon menus but substituted ham for the bacon and a toasted English muffin for the toast.

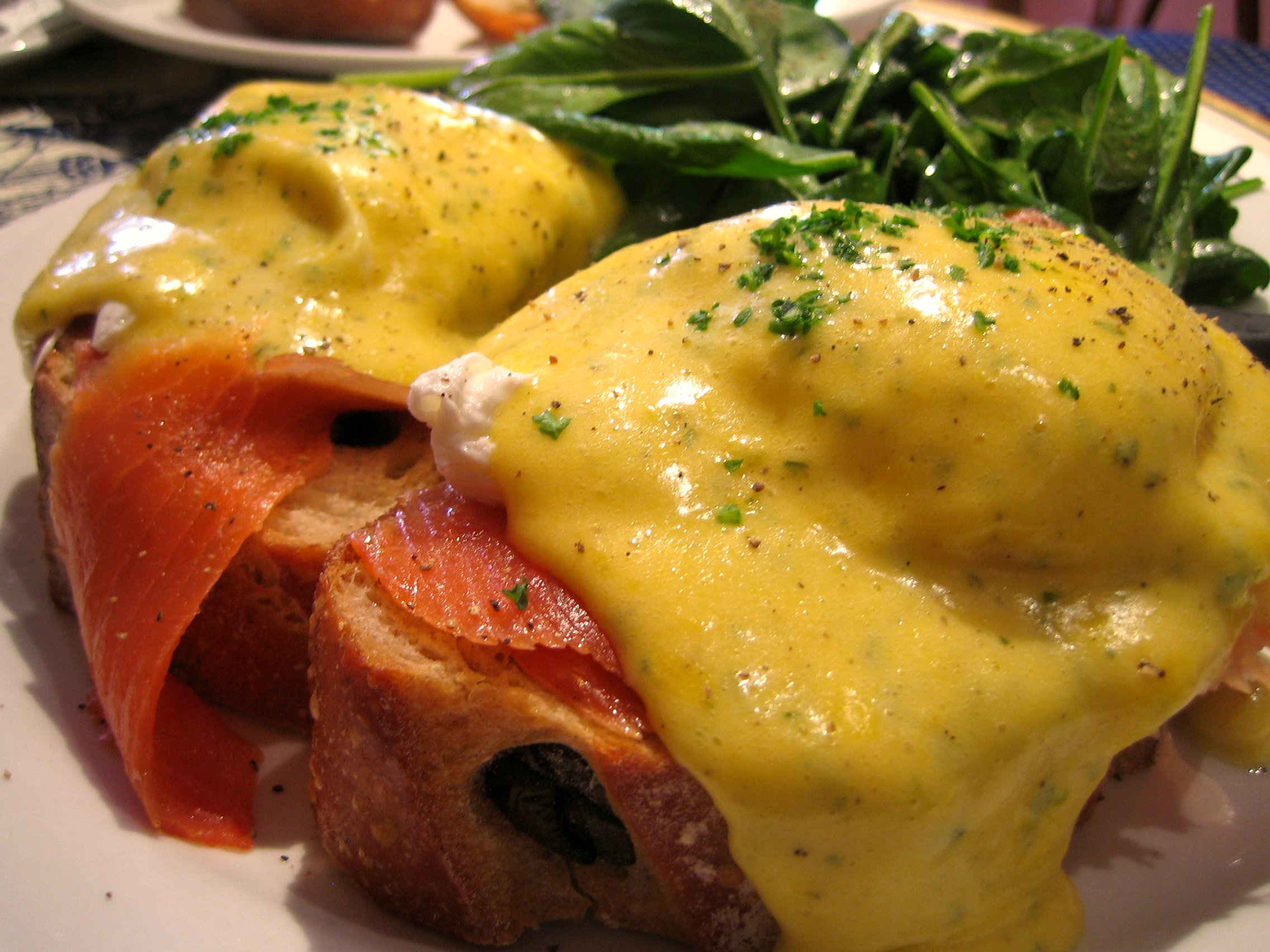
Eggs Atlantic (i.e. Eggs Royale) with smoked salmon in place of Canadian bacon

A later claim to the creation of eggs Benedict was circuitously made by Edward P. Montgomery on behalf of Commodore E. C. Benedict. In 1967 Montgomery wrote a letter to then The New York Times food columnist Craig Claiborne, which included a recipe he said he had received through his uncle, a friend of the commodore. Commodore Benedict's recipe—by way of Montgomery—varies greatly from Ranhofer's version, particularly in the hollandaise sauce preparation—calling for the addition of a "hot, hard-cooked egg and ham mixture".

The modern version differs slightly from these early versions and has a split English muffin, topped with Canadian bacon or ham, lightly poached egg, and covered in hollandaise sauce, which is made from eggs, lemon, and melted butter.

== Variations ==
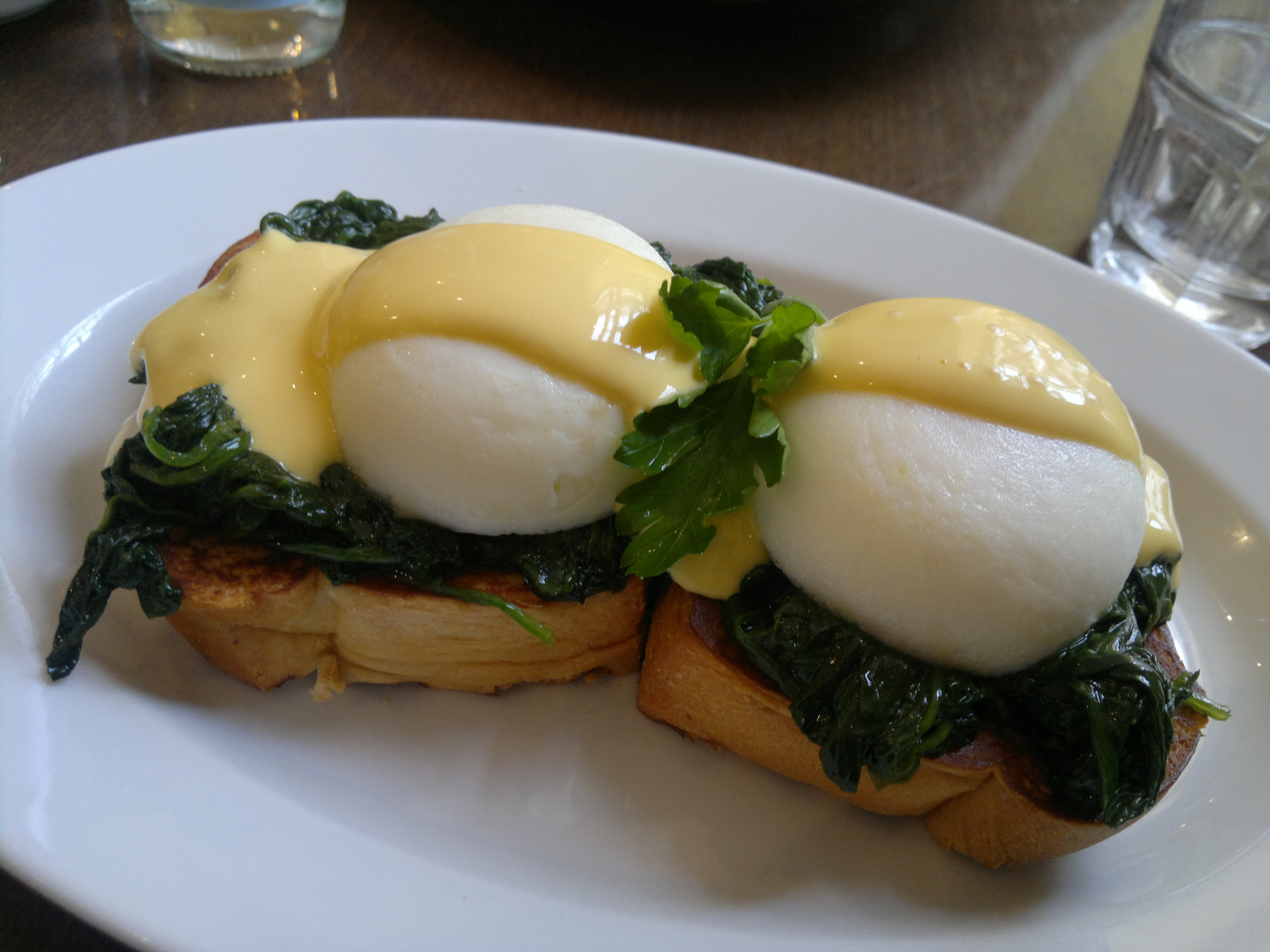
Eggs Florentine with spinach in place of Canadian bacon

It is popular to make variations on eggs Benedict, and some of the most popular are eggs florentine (spinach replaces bacon), eggs royale (smoked salmon replaces bacon), eggs Sardou (spinach and artichoke replaces bacon and muffin), eggs neptune (crab replaces bacon), and eggs cochon (pulled pork replaces bacon and buttermilk biscuit replaces the muffin). In many cases it has become popular to simply replace the word eggs with the meat that replaces the bacon, for example, rather than eggs neptune, crab benedict, even though the recipe still has two poached eggs. Examples of this are steak benedict or salmon benedict, and replacements include corned beef, fried chicken, or shrimp.

Many variations of eggs Benedict exist, the most common involve replacing the bacon or English muffin, or both:

- Avocado toast eggs Benedict – substitutes toast in place of the muffin and adds sliced avocado.
- California eggs Benedict – adds sliced Hass avocado. Variations may include sliced tomato instead of Canadian bacon.
- Eggs Balmoral – substitutes haggis in place of Canadian bacon.
- Eggs Blackstone – substitutes streaky bacon in place of Canadian bacon and adds a tomato slice.
- Eggs Blanchard – substitutes béchamel sauce in place of Hollandaise.
- Canadiana Eggs Benedict - substitutes Montreal smoked meat in place of Canadian bacon and mixes maple syrup in the Hollandaise sauce.
- Eggs Chesapeake (crab eggs Benedict, crab cakes Benedict) – substitutes a Maryland blue crab cake in place of Canadian bacon.

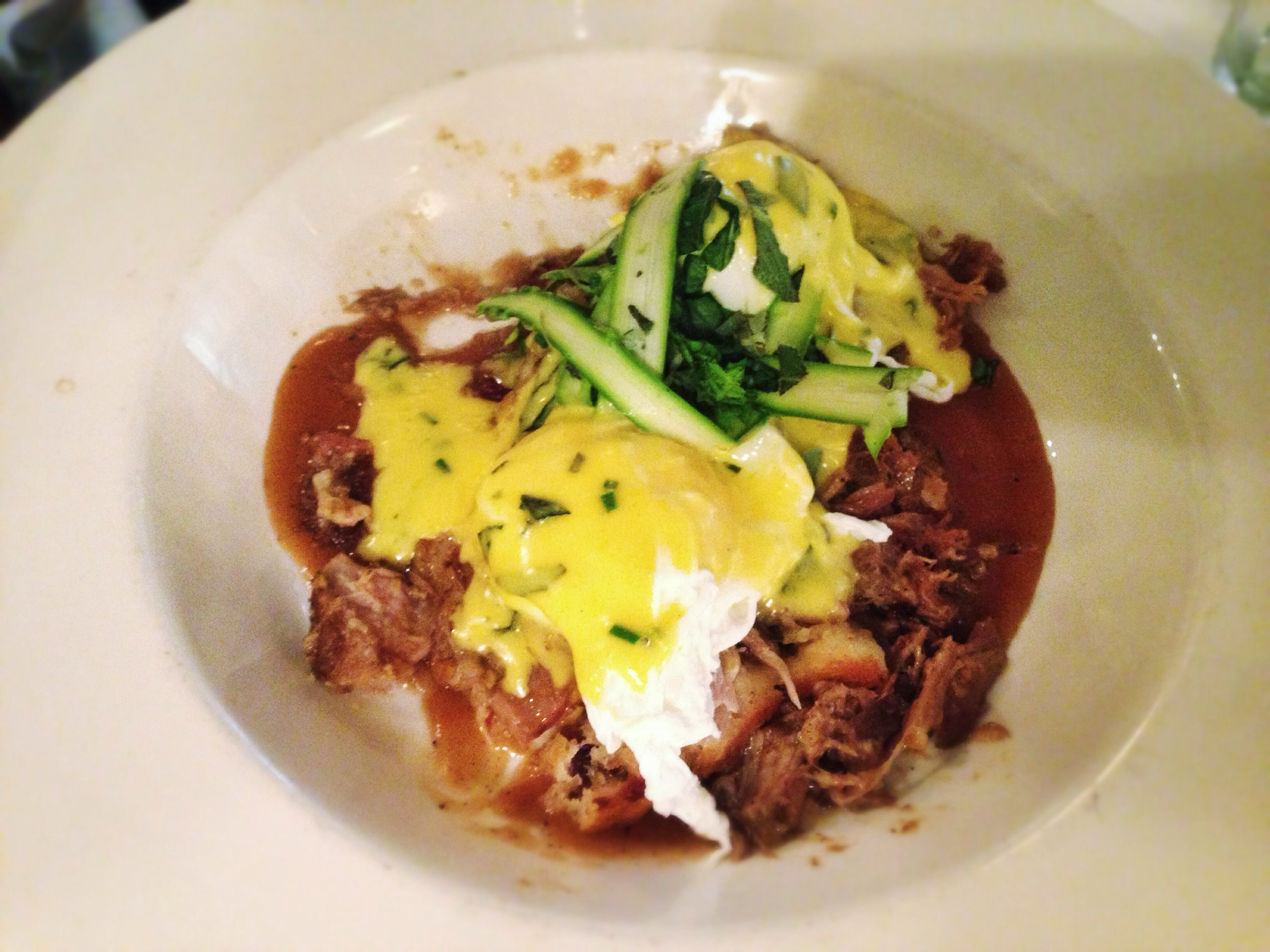
Eggs Cochon served at a New Orleans restaurant

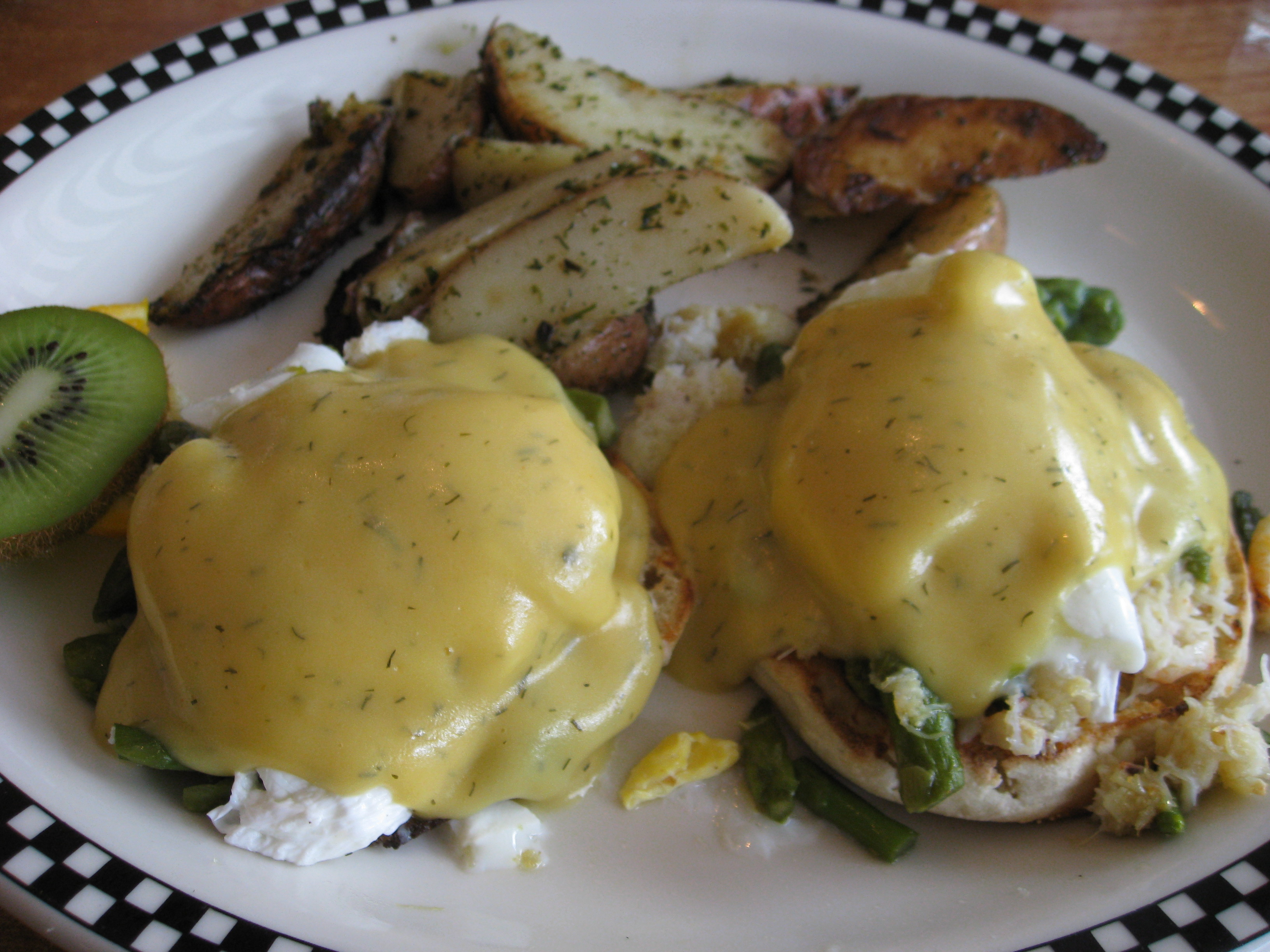
Crab and asparagus eggs benedict, served in Maine

- Eggs Cochon (eggs cochon de lait) – substitutes pork "debris" (slow roasted pork shredded in its own juices) in place of Canadian bacon, buttermilk biscuit in place of the English muffin. Served in New Orleans restaurants.
- Eggs Florentine – adds spinach, sometimes substituted in place of the Canadian bacon. Older versions of eggs Florentine add spinach to poached or shirred eggs. The cheese gruyère mornay is added, though sometimes hollandaise is subbed.
- Eggs Hebridean – a Scottish variety, substitutes black pudding in place of the Canadian bacon.
- Eggs Hussarde – substitutes Holland rusks in place of the English muffin and adds Bordelaise sauce.
- Eggs Mornay – substitutes Mornay sauce in place of the Hollandaise.
- Eggs Neptune – substitutes crab meat in place of Canadian bacon.
- Steak Benedict – substitutes a small steak in place of Canadian bacon and sometimes replaces the Hollandaise with béarnaise.
- Eggs Royale (Note: Other name variations for Eggs Royale include Eggs Atlantic, Eggs Benjamin, Eggs Charlotte, Eggs Copenhagen, Eggs Halifax, Eggs Hemingway, Eggs Montreal, Eggs Norwegian (Norvégienne), Eggs Pacifico, Eggs Victoria, Oregon Benedict, smoked salmon Benedict, and smoked salmon eggs Benny.) – substitutes salmon which may be smoked, in place of Canadian bacon.
- Eggs Trivette – adds Creole mustard to the Hollandaise and a topping of crayfish.
- Eggs Sardou – a 19th-century New Orleans variation that has poached eggs with artichoke hearts, creamed spinach, and hollandaise sauce.
- Eggs Woodhouse – includes two eggs and artichoke hearts, creamed spinach, bechamel sauce, Iberico ham, black truffle and beluga caviar. The recipe is featured in the book How To Archer, inspired by the television series Archer on FXX.
- Eggs Zenedict – adds toasted scone and peameal bacon smothered in sundried tomato Hollandaise. A specialty of restaurants in the defunct Canadian retail chain Zellers.
- Huevos Benedictos – adds sliced avocado or Mexican chorizo, topped with salsa (such as salsa roja or salsa brava) and Hollandaise sauce.
- Irish Benedict – substitutes corned beef or Irish bacon in place of Canadian bacon.
- Miner's Benedict – substitutes slices of fried black pudding in place of the Canadian bacon.
- Mushroom Benedict – substitutes grilled flat mushrooms in place of the Canadian bacon.
- New Jersey Benedict – substitutes Taylor pork roll in place of Canadian bacon.

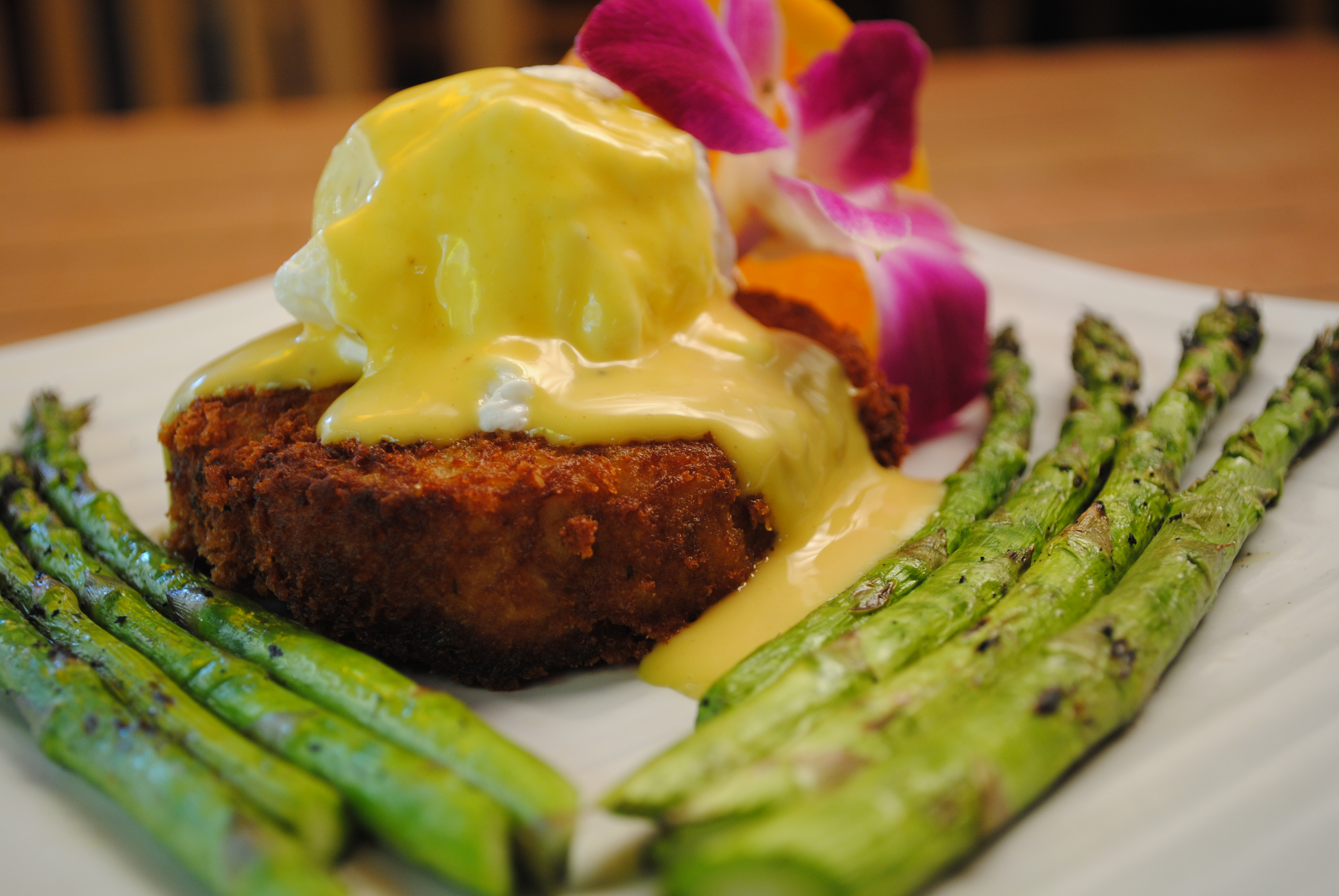
Crab cake benedict, replacing bacon and muffin with a crab cake

Some variations involve replacing the Canadian bacon, such as lobster benedict, corned beef, or steak benedict. In other cases the bread might be changed from an English muffin, to toast, sliced potato, or a biscuit. One popular variation is to replace the Canadian bacon with smoked salmon, and it has gathered a large number of names from Eggs Royale, Atlantic, Montreal, and others, and some regions have a local name for this variation.

Meatless Eggs Benedict may omit the Canadian bacon altogether, or replace it with something else such as avocado, tomato, mushroom, or tofu. There is a version of California Eggs Benedict that replaces the Canadian bacon with sliced tomato and avocado.

Eggs benedict has also been made into breakfast sandwich by adding an additional English muffin half on top.

A version which replaces the sauce is Eggs Halifax, which substitutes New England clam chowder for hollandaise.

== See also ==
- List of breakfast foods
- List of brunch foods
- List of egg dishes
- List of foods named after people
- List of regional dishes of the United States
- McMuffin
