= Soy egg =

Egg dishes

Soy Egg
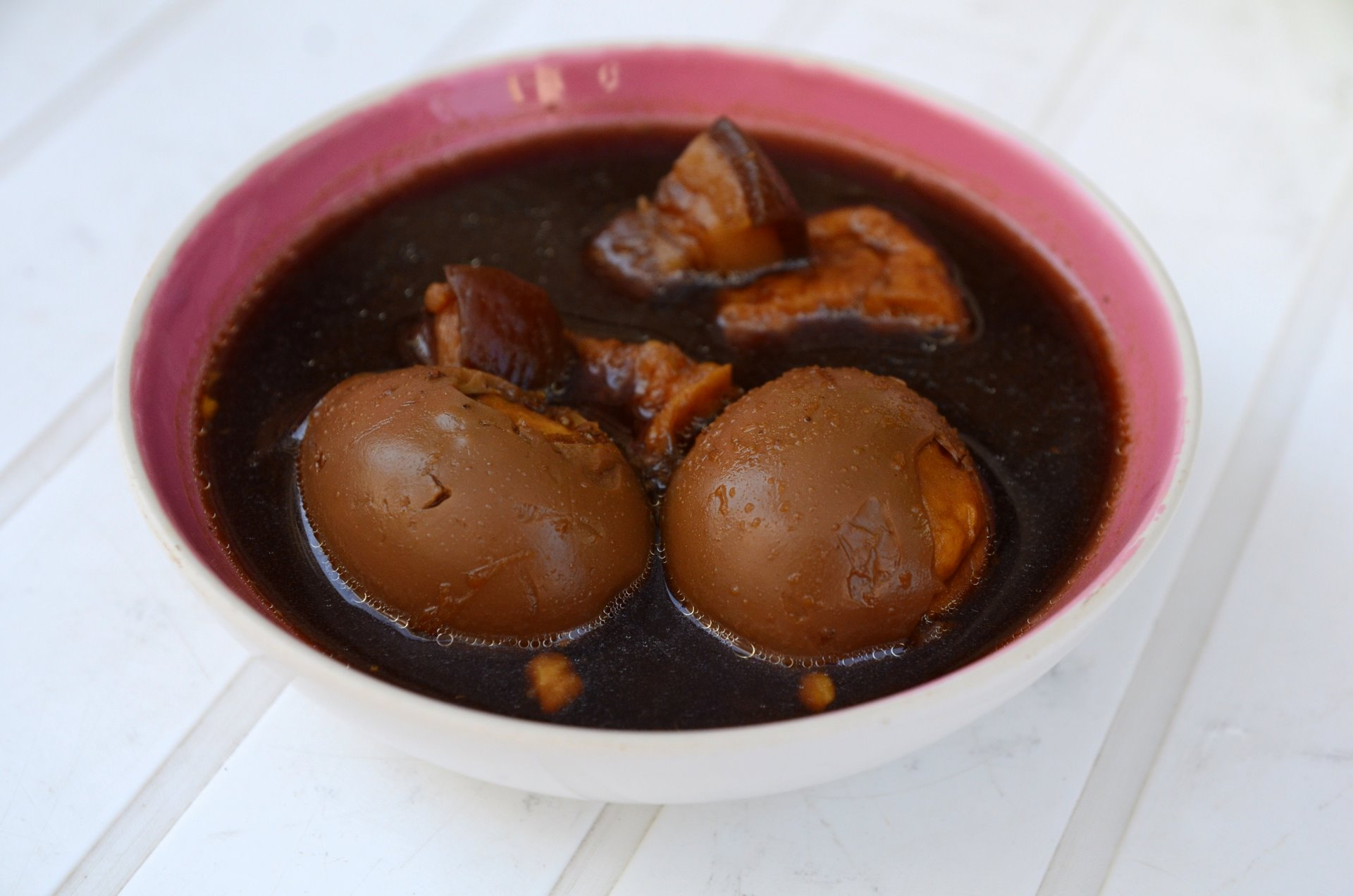
- Alternative names: Braised egg
- Place of origin: China
- Main ingredients: Egg, soy sauce, sugar, water

Soy egg

Chinese name
- Traditional Chinese: 滷蛋
- Simplified Chinese: 卤蛋
- Literal meaning: braised egg
Transcriptions
Standard Mandarin
- Hanyu Pinyin: lǔ dàn
- Bopomofo: ㄌㄨˇ ㄉㄢˋ
Yue: Cantonese
- Jyutping: lou5 daan2
Southern Min
- Tâi-lô: lóo-nn̄g

Vietnamese name
- Vietnamese: trứng nước tương
- Chữ Nôm: 𠨡渃醬

Korean name
- Hangul: 알장조림
Transcriptions
- Revised Romanization: aljangjorim

Japanese name
- Kanji: 味付け玉子
- Kana: あじつけ たまご
Transcriptions
- Revised Hepburn: ajitsuke tamago

A soy egg (a.k.a. braised egg) is a type of egg in Chinese, Vietnamese, Korean, Japanese, and Mauritian cuisine which is boiled, peeled, and then cooked in a mixture of soy sauce, sugar, water, and other optional herbs and spices, like star anise or cinnamon. Other ingredients such as meat, vegetables and tofu can be cooked in the same red cooking method, resulting in dishes generally referred to as lou mei. Soy eggs can be made from chicken, duck, and quail eggs.

This preparation is very similar to that of tea eggs. A soy egg that has been repeatedly stewed and dried until dark and chewy is called iron egg.

== Chinese and Vietnamese cuisines ==
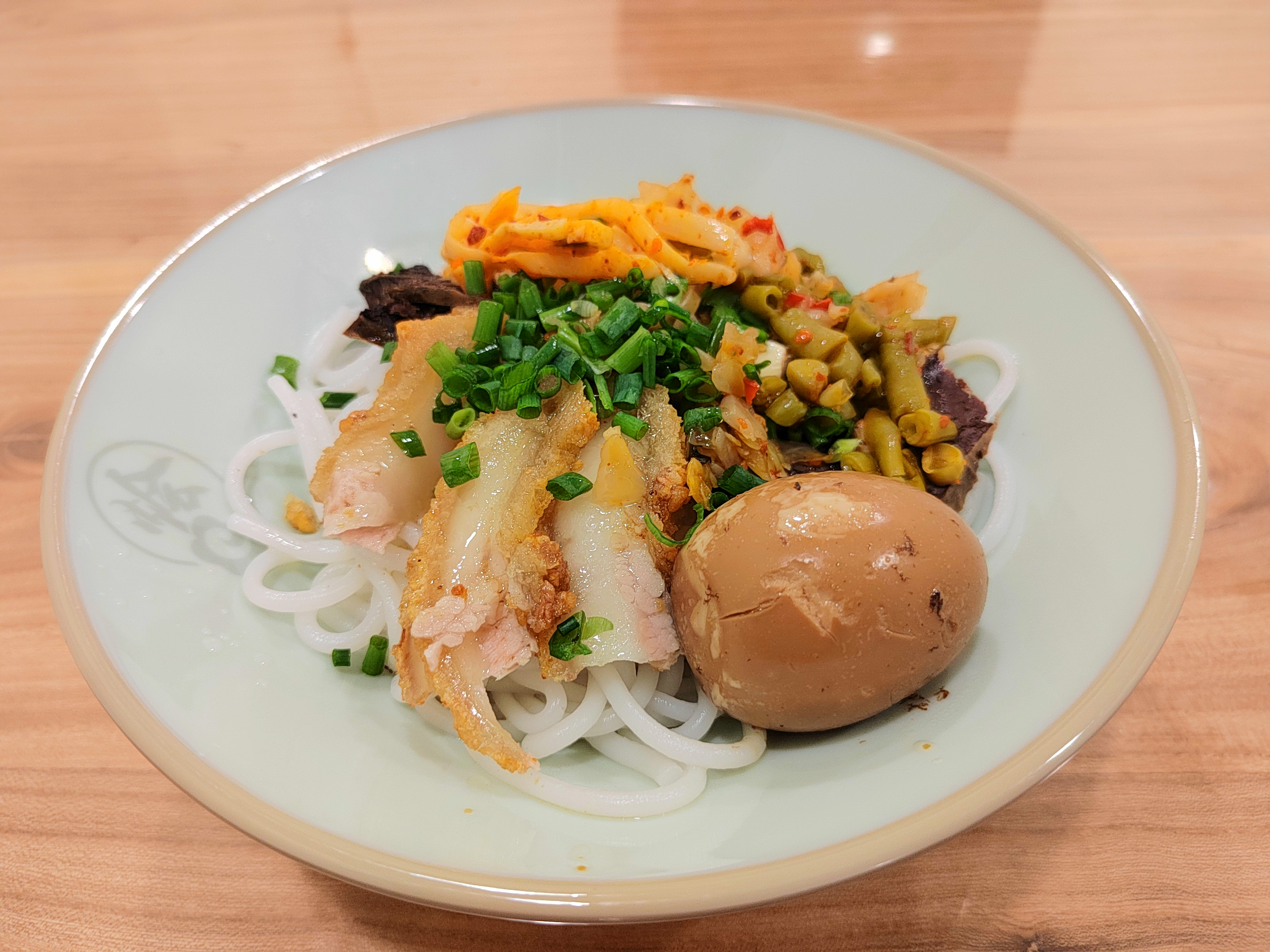
Ludan with Guilin rice noodles

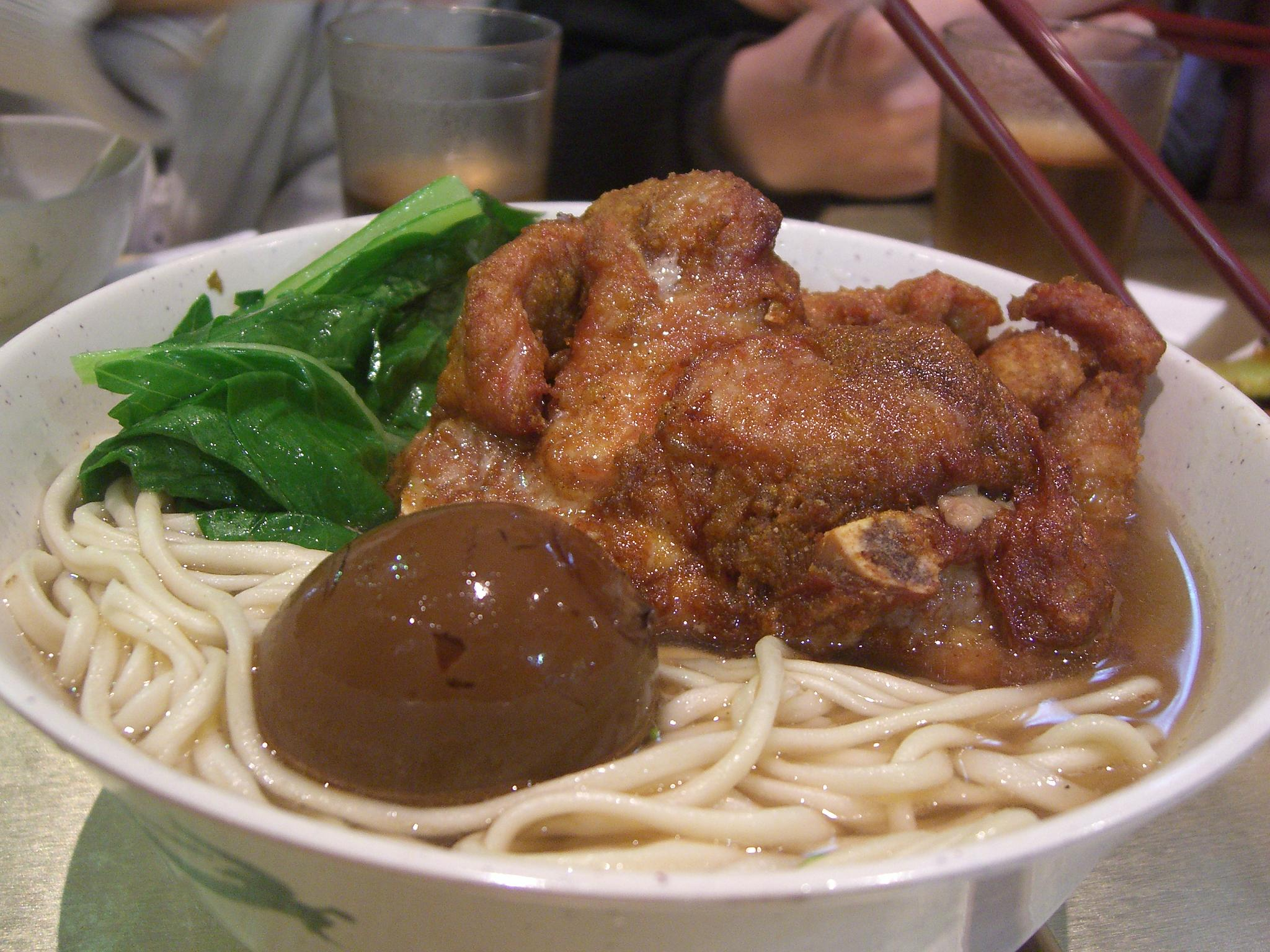
Ludan in noodle soup with fried porkchop

The Chinese and Vietnamese soy sauce eggs is called lujidan, (滷雞蛋/卤鸡蛋), ludan (滷蛋/卤蛋) or trứng nước tương. It is one of the most popular type of street foods. The marinating sauce is called lushui (滷水/卤水)

They are typically served with noodles, in a broth made from their seasoned cooking liquid. Soy eggs may be eaten individually as a snack. They can also be eaten with steamed rice. They are sometimes used as a condiment in congee.

They can also be used in traditional Chinese and Vietnamese egg dishes in which regular eggs, century eggs, and soy eggs are steamed together. Soy eggs are also very commonly added as a side dish in Lor mee or Hainanese chicken rice.

== Mauritian cuisine ==
Soy egg is known as "dizef roti" in Mauritius (lit. translated as "roasted egg" in English and "roti d'oeuf" or "oeuf roti" in French). It is one of the Mauritian dishes influenced by Mauritians of Chinese origin. The "dizef roti" can be found on the island all year long. It can be eaten as noodles toppings, inside bao zi (called "pow" in Mauritius), and as appetizers. As appetizers, it is cut into quarters; it is a very popular of snacks on more festive occasions. When cooked, the egg yolk is typically completely cooked.

Another version of the soy egg is the "dizef roti mimosa" (lit. translated as "roasted mimosa egg"), a form of Chinese fusion food, which involves the combination the cooking and preparation techniques of soy eggs and egg mimosa.

== Japanese cuisine ==
A similar technique is used in Japan to create soy sauce marinated eggs called ajitsuke tamago (味付け玉子), also known as "marinated half-cooked egg", or ajitama (味玉) or nitamago (煮玉子), which are traditionally served with ramen as toppings. In Japan, soy eggs are generally used in soups and simple main dishes, but Japanese-American home cook Namiko Chen of Just One Cookbook says in a recipe on ramen egg that they are "amazing to enjoy as a side dish or alone as a snack, or included as part of bento. You can even add them to your salad or in a sandwich." Japanese soy sauce (shoyu, 醤油) is lighter, sweeter, and less salty than most Chinese soy sauces. In Japan, eggs are also often marinated in a miso mixture, which is similar to a soy sauce mixture, giving the whites an umami flavour.

== See also ==
- Balut
- Century egg
- Chinese red eggs
- List of Chinese dishes
- List of Japanese dishes
- Jangjorim
- Salted duck egg
- Smoked egg
