= Century egg =

Chinese preserved egg

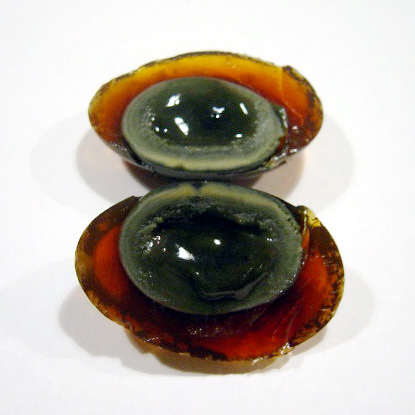
- A century egg sliced open
- Alternative names: preserved egg, hundred-year egg, thousand-year egg, thousand-year-old egg, millennium egg, black egg, blacking egg, skin egg, old egg
- Place of origin: Hunan, China
- Main ingredients: Egg preserved in clay, ash, salt, quicklime, and rice hulls
- Variations: duck, chicken, or quail eggs

Century egg

Chinese name
- Chinese: 皮蛋
- Literal meaning: "leather/skin egg"
Transcriptions
Standard Mandarin
- Hanyu Pinyin: pídàn
- IPA: [pʰǐ.tân]
Yue: Cantonese
- Yale Romanization: pèih dáan
- Jyutping: pei4 daan2
Southern Min
- Hokkien POJ: phî-tàn

Alternative Chinese name
- Chinese: 松花蛋
- Literal meaning: pine-patterned egg
Transcriptions
Standard Mandarin
- Hanyu Pinyin: sōnghuādàn
Yue: Cantonese
- Yale Romanization: chùhng fā dáan
- Jyutping: cung4 faa1 daan2

Second alternative Chinese name
- Chinese: 彩蛋
- Literal meaning: colorful egg
Transcriptions
Southern Min
- Hokkien POJ: chhái-tàn

Third alternative Chinese name
- Chinese: 灰卵
- Literal meaning: grey egg
Transcriptions
Southern Min
- Hokkien POJ: hoe-nn̄g / he-nn̄g

Vietnamese name
- Vietnamese alphabet: trứng bắc thảo / trứng bách thảo
- Hán-Nôm: 𠨡鴨北草 / 𠨡百草
- Literal meaning: northern herb egg / hundred-herb egg

Thai name
- Thai: ไข่เยี่ยวม้า [kʰàj jîa̯w máː]
- RTGS: khai yiao ma

Japanese name
- Kanji: 皮蛋
- Kana: ピータン
Transcriptions
- Romanization: pītan

Khmer name
- Khmer: ស៊ុតបម្រុងទុក

Century eggs (Chinese: 皮蛋; pinyin: pídàn; Jyutping: pei4 daan2), (also called preserved egg or 100-year egg) also known as alkalized or preserved eggs, is a Chinese dish made by preserving duck, chicken, or quail eggs in a mixture of clay, ash, salt, quicklime, and rice hulls for several weeks to several months, depending on the processing method.

Through the process, the yolk becomes dark greenish-grey in color, with a smooth consistency and strong flavor due to the hydrogen sulfide and ammonia present, while the white becomes dark brown in color, with a translucent jelly-like appearance, a gelatinous texture, and a salty and umami flavor. The transforming agent in the century egg is an alkaline salt, which gradually raises the pH of the egg to around 9–12 during the curing process. This chemical process breaks down some of the complex, flavorless proteins and fats, producing a variety of smaller flavorful compounds.

Some eggs have patterns near the surface of the egg white likened to pine branches. These patterned eggs are regarded as having better quality than the normal century eggs and are called Songhua eggs (Chinese: 松花蛋), variously translated as pine flower eggs or pine-patterned eggs.

== History ==
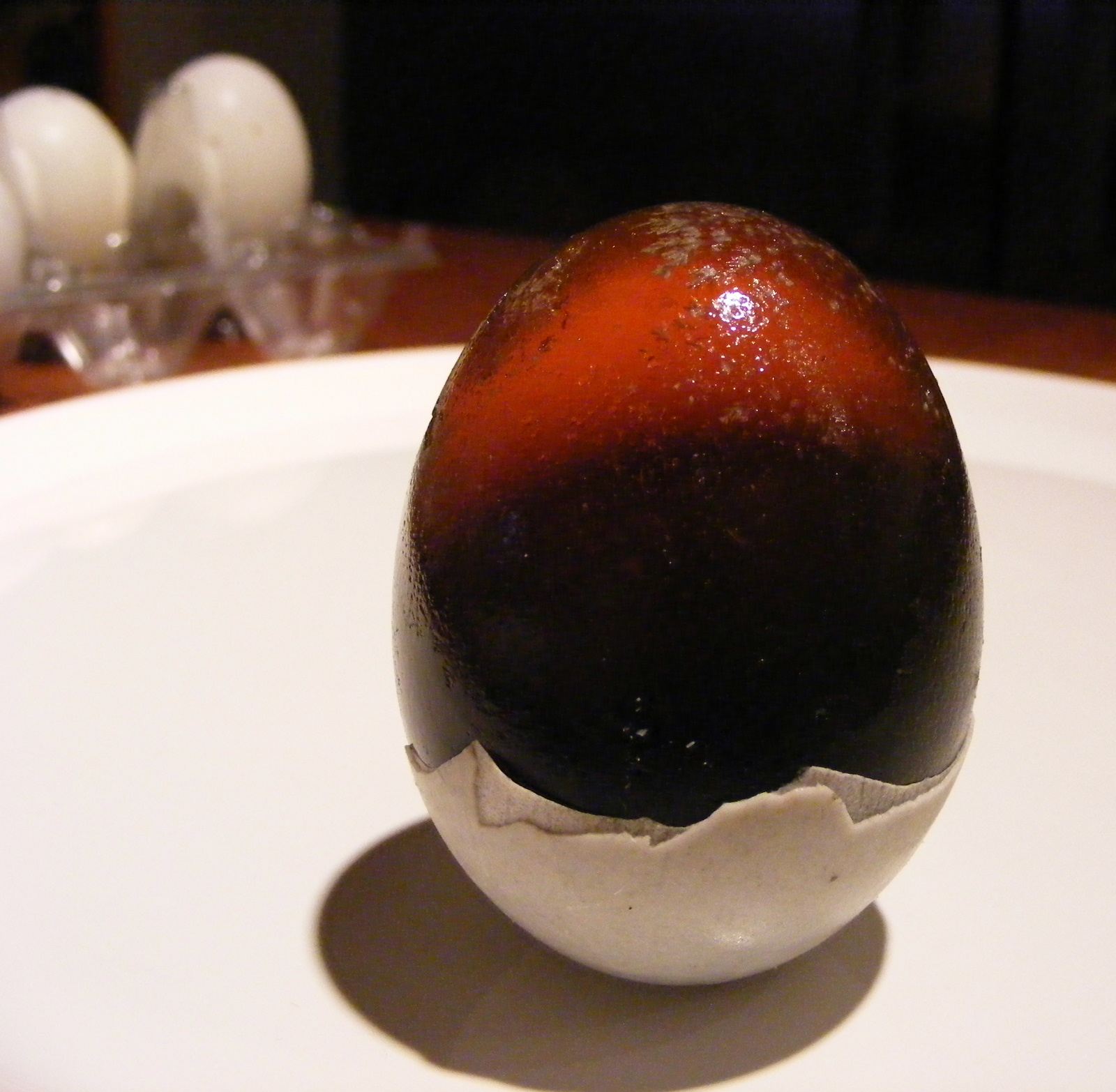
Peeled century egg

The method for creating century eggs likely came about through the need to preserve eggs in times of plenty by coating them in alkaline clay, which is similar to methods of egg preservation in some Western cultures. The clay hardens around the egg and results in the curing and creation of century eggs instead of spoiled eggs.

The century egg is known to have been present in Chinese cuisine since at least the 17th century CE and its purported origins are the subject of several folk tales. In one such tale, a homeowner living in Hunan during the Ming Dynasty discovered duck eggs in a shallow pool of slaked lime that was used for mortar during construction of his home two months before. Upon tasting the eggs, he set out to produce more – this time with the addition of salt to improve their flavor – resulting in the present recipe of the century egg. An alternate story involves a young duck farmer by the name of Shuige (水哥, lit. water-brother), also from Hunan, leaving duck eggs in the garden of a woman by the name of Songmei (松妹, lit. pine-sister) as a courting gesture. The eggs were not discovered until the woman cleaned out the ash pit half a month later where they had turned into century eggs. In her honour, the farmer named the transformed eggs with their delicate crystalline patterns on their surfaces "pine-patterned eggs".

Preserved eggs were called "Chaoszi" in the Ming Dynasty. The 17th-century writer Fang Yizhi's "Little Knowledge of Physics" (物理小識) states: "The eggs produced in Chizhou are salted with five kinds of tree ash. Buckwheat grain ash is mixed to make it yellow and white, and charcoal lime is added to make it green and tough".

== Methods ==
=== Traditional ===
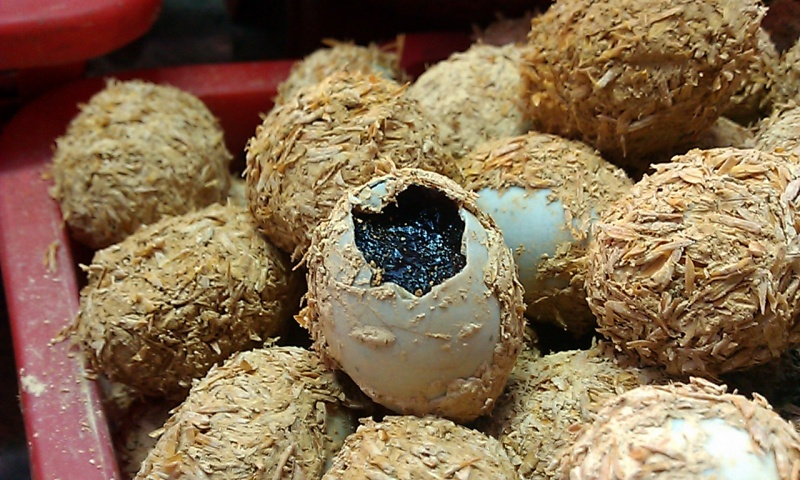
Century eggs coated in a caustic mixture of mud and rice husk

The traditional method for producing century eggs developed through improvement of the aforementioned primitive process. Instead of using only clay, a mixture of wood ash, calcium oxide, and salt is included in the plastering mixture, thereby increasing its pH and sodium content. The addition of calcium oxide and wood ash to the mixture lowers the risk of spoilage and also increases the speed of the process. A recipe for creating century eggs starts with the infusion of 1.4 kg (3 lb) of tea in boiling water. A smooth paste is then formed by mixing 1.4 kg (3 lb) of calcium oxide (3.2 kg or 7 lb, if done in winter), 4.1 kg (9 lb) of sea salt, and 3.2 kg (7 lb) of ash from burned oak, before being added to the tea. Each egg is individually covered by hand, with gloves worn to protect the skin from chemical burns. It is then rolled in a mass of rice chaff, to keep the eggs from adhering to one another, before the eggs are placed in cloth-covered jars or tightly woven baskets. The mud slowly dries and hardens into a crust over several months. The eggs are then ready for consumption.

=== Modern ===
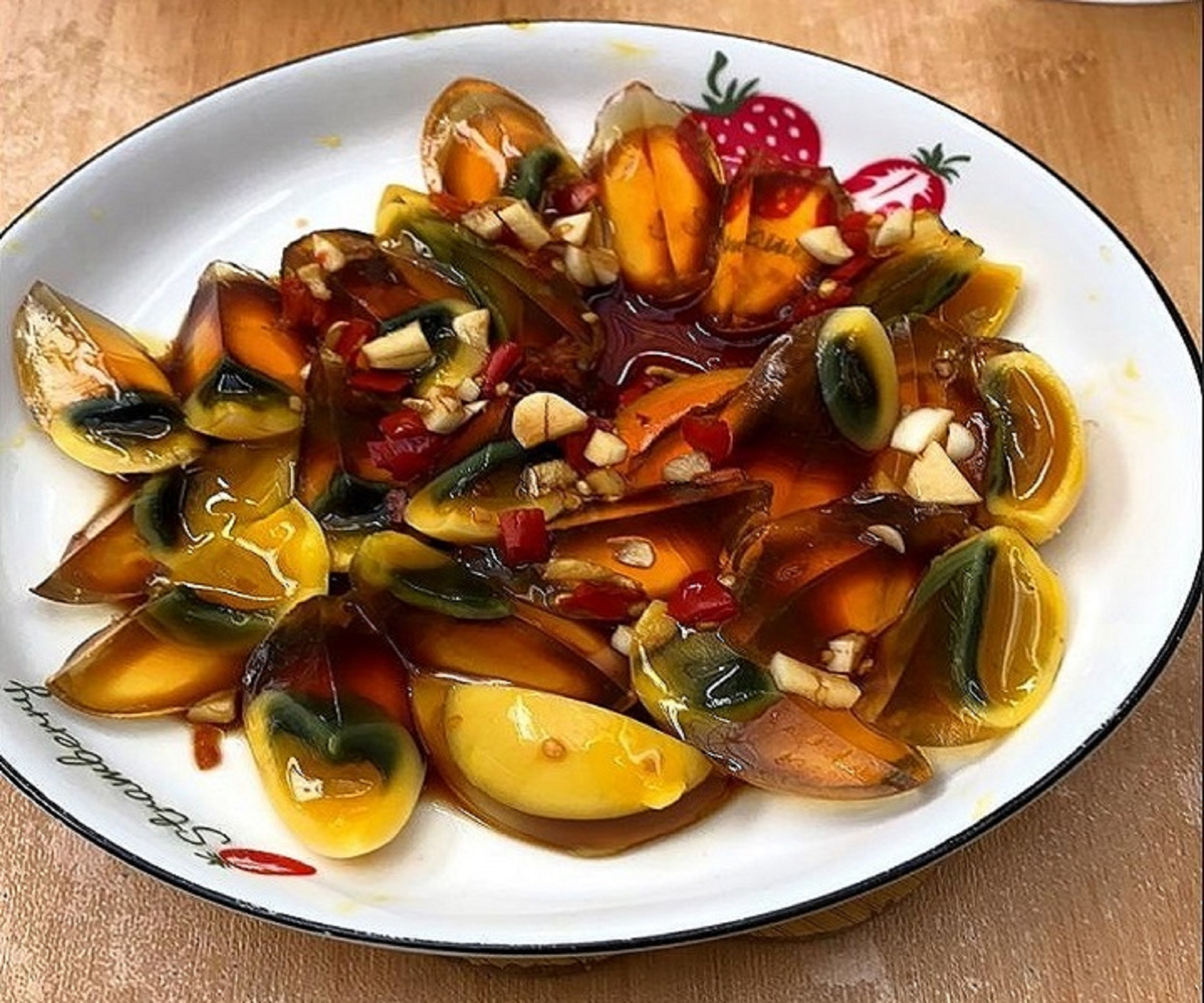
Century eggs from Shangqiu, China

Even though the traditional method is still widely practised, modern understanding of the chemistry behind the formation of century eggs has led to many simplifications in the recipe. Today, soaking raw eggs in a solution of table salt, calcium hydroxide and sodium carbonate for 10 days, followed by several weeks of aging in an airtight container, can achieve a similar effect to the traditional method. This is because the chemical reaction needed to produce century eggs is accomplished by introducing hydroxide and sodium ions into the egg, regardless of the method used.

The extremely toxic compound lead(II) oxide speeds up the reactions that create century eggs, leading to its use by some producers, whereas zinc oxide is now the recommended alternative. Although zinc is essential for life, excessive zinc consumption can lead to copper deficiency, and the finished product should have its zinc level assessed for safety.

=== Misconception ===
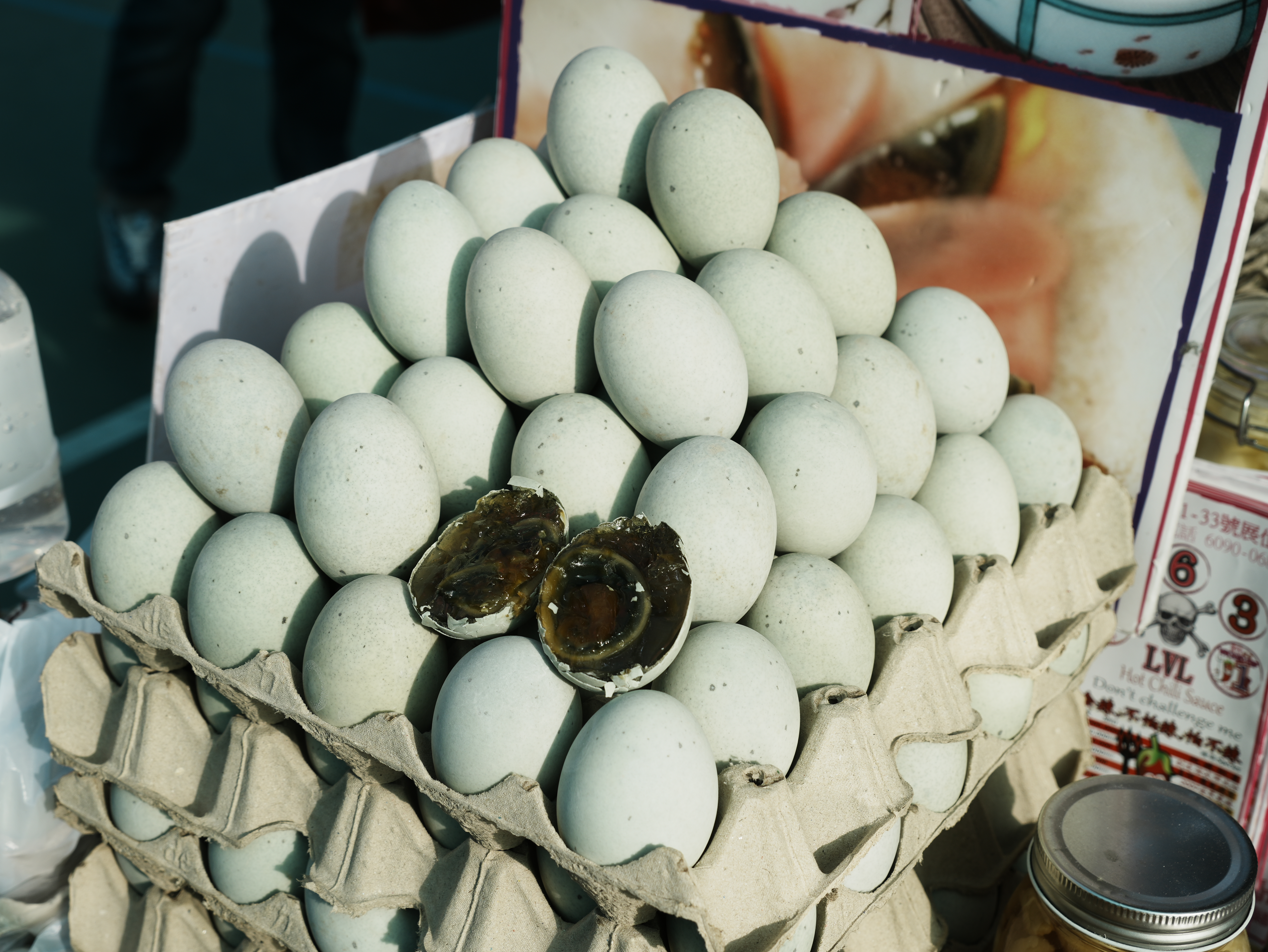
Sold in Mong Kok, Hong Kong

There is a misconception that century eggs are prepared by soaking eggs in horse urine, but this is not true. In Thai and Lao, the common word for century egg translates to "horse urine egg", due to this misconception or due to the eggs' ammonia odor:

- Thai: ไข่เยี่ยวม้า [kʰàj jîaw máː] (RTGS: khai yiao ma)
- Lao: ໄຂ່ຍ່ຽວມ້າ [kʰāj ɲīaw mâː]

== Uses ==
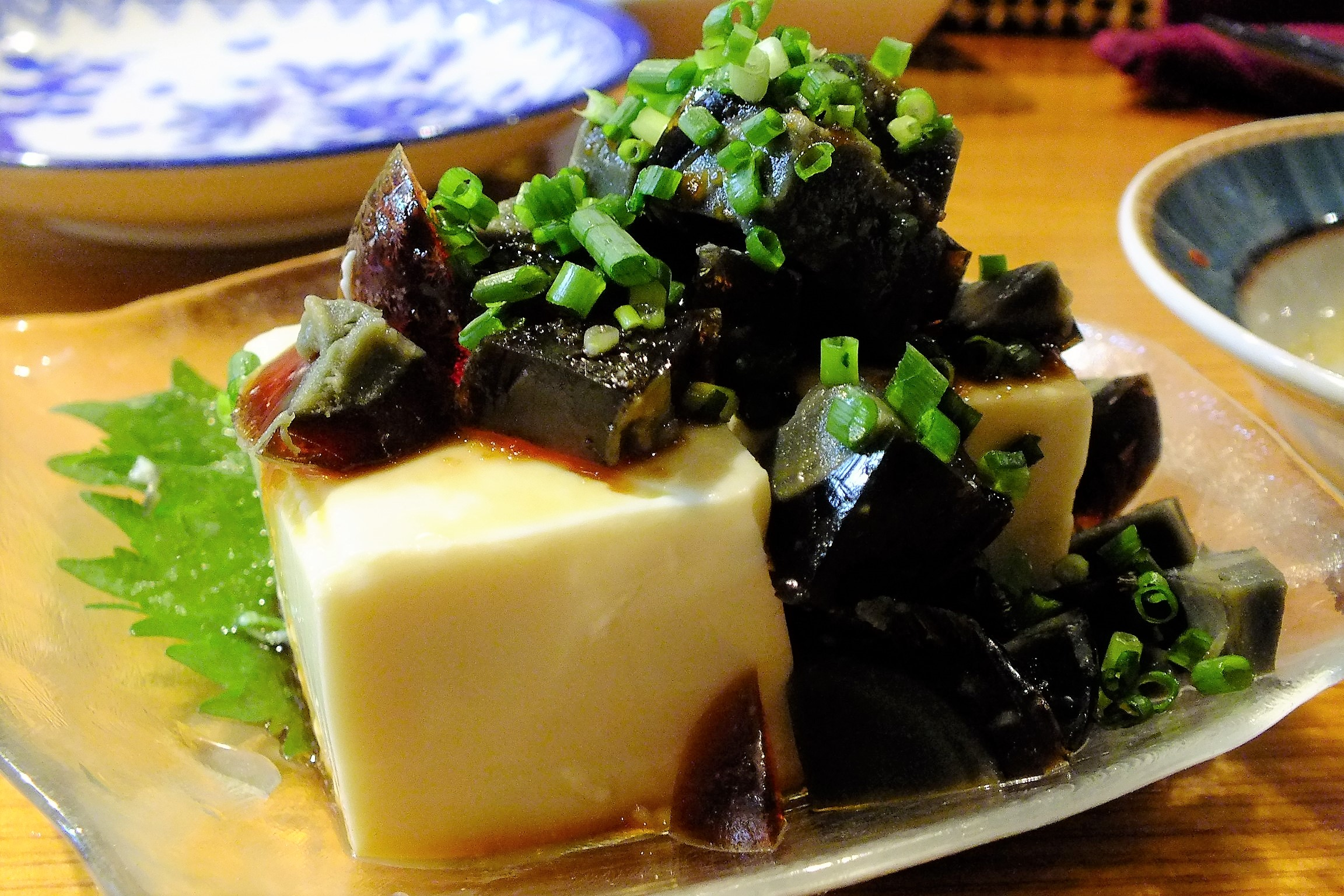
Century egg and tofu, a common combination

Century eggs can be eaten without further preparation other than peeling and rinsing them, akin to a traditional hard-boiled egg – on their own, or as a side dish. In central China, they are sliced into pieces and drizzled with black vinegar and served as a side dish. As an hors d'œuvre, the Cantonese wrap chunks of this egg with slices of pickled ginger root (sometimes sold on a stick as street food). A Shanghainese recipe mixes chopped century eggs with chilled tofu. In Taiwan, it is popular to eat sliced century eggs placed on top of cold tofu with katsuobushi, soy sauce, and sesame oil, in a style similar to Japanese hiyayakko. A variation of this recipe common in northern China is to slice century eggs over chilled silken (soft) tofu, add liberal quantities of shredded young ginger and chopped spring onions as a topping, and then drizzle light soy sauce and sesame oil over the dish, to taste. They are also used in a dish called old-and-fresh eggs, where chopped century eggs are combined with (or used to top) an omelette made with fresh eggs. The century eggs may also be cut into chunks and stir fried with vegetables, which is most commonly found in Taiwanese cuisine.

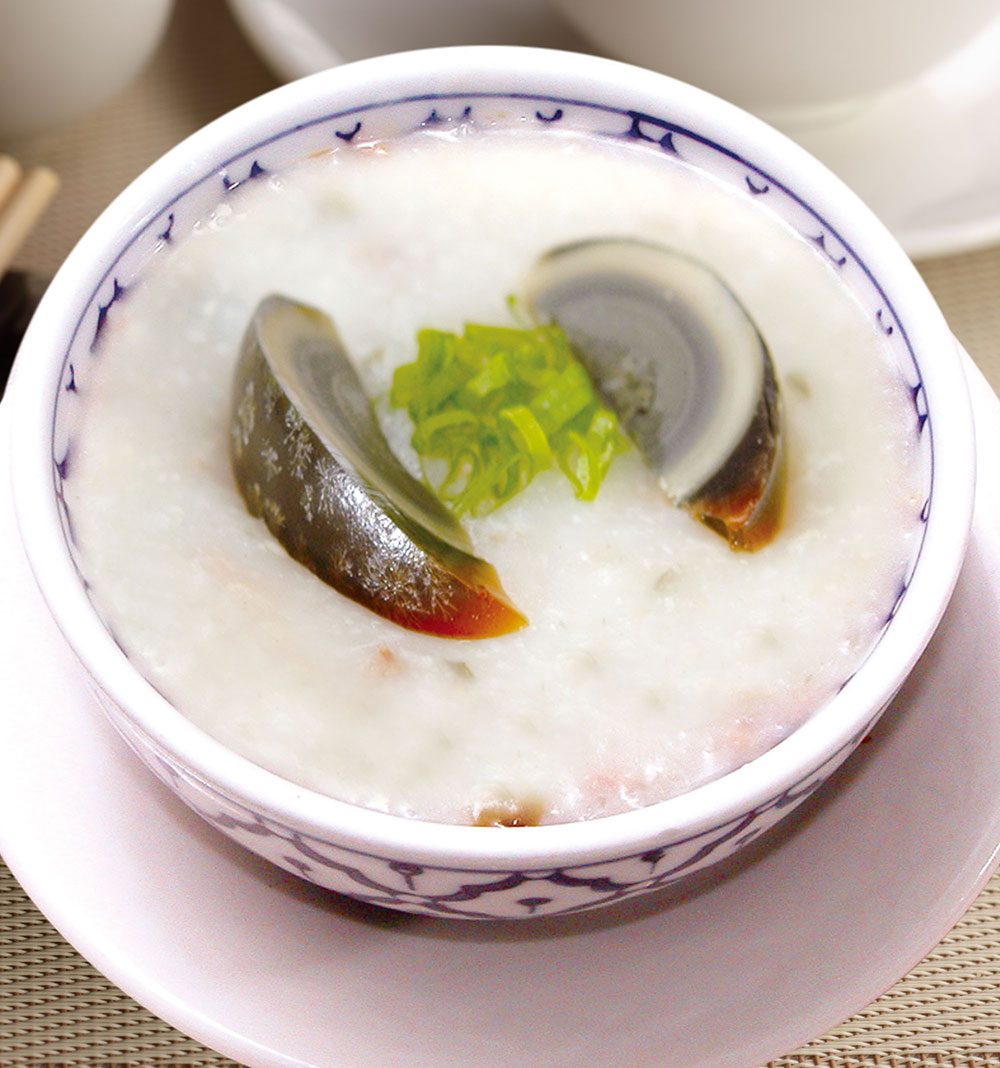
Century egg and congee

Some Chinese households cut them up into small chunks and cook them with rice porridge to create "century egg and lean pork congee" (Chinese: 皮蛋瘦肉粥; pinyin: pídàn shòuròu zhōu). This is sometimes served in dim sum restaurants. Rice congee, lean pork, and century egg are the main ingredients. Peeled century eggs are cut into quarters or eighths and simmered with the seasoned marinated lean slivers of pork until both ingredients are cooked into the rice congee. Fried dough sticks known as youtiao are commonly eaten with century egg congee. Another common variation of this dish is the addition of salted duck eggs into the congee mixture.

At special events like wedding banquets or birthday parties, a first-course platter of sliced barbecued pork, pickled baby leeks, sliced abalone, pickled julienned carrots, pickled julienned daikon radish, seasoned julienned jellyfish, sliced pork, head cheese and the quartered century eggs is served. This is called a lahng-poon in Cantonese, which simply means "cold dish".

== Nutritional facts ==
Generally, century eggs contain about 13% protein, 11% fat, 2% carbohydrate, and 2% ash. Their alkaline pickling process causes a unique amino acid composition compared to fresh eggs. Leucine, aspargine, and glutamine are synthesized during the process, while lysine, serine, and threonine are reduced. Recommended Daily Allowance (RDA) for sodium is 1500 mg; each 100 grams of egg white contains 2250 mg of sodium (150% RDA), and 100 grams of the yolk contains 1516 mg of sodium (100% RDA).

== Safety ==
Century eggs prepared in traditional ways are generally safe to consume. However, there have been incidents of malpractice in century egg production that causes eggs to be contaminated. In 2013, three factories in Jiangxi province were found to be using industrial copper sulphate in century egg production to shorten the production time. The industrial copper sulphate was contaminated with heavy metals and toxic chemicals. The incident was exposed on China's national broadcaster CCTV, causing local officials to shut down 30 factories for inspection. The police arrested three people involved in the case and seized four businesses involved in the case.

== Gallery ==
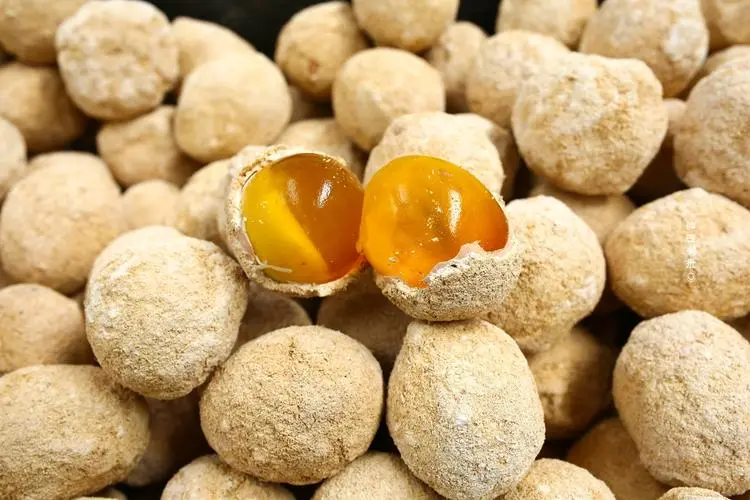

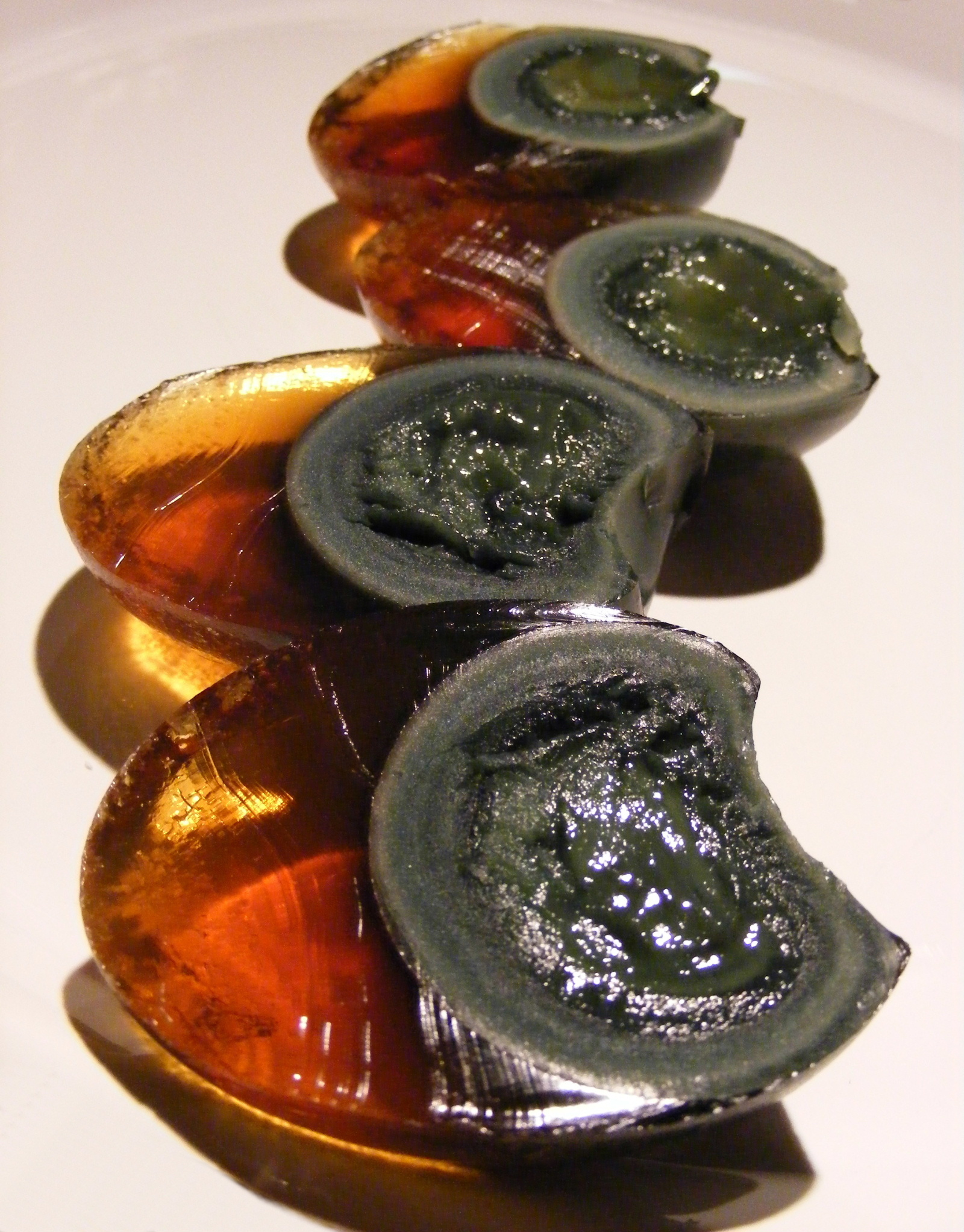

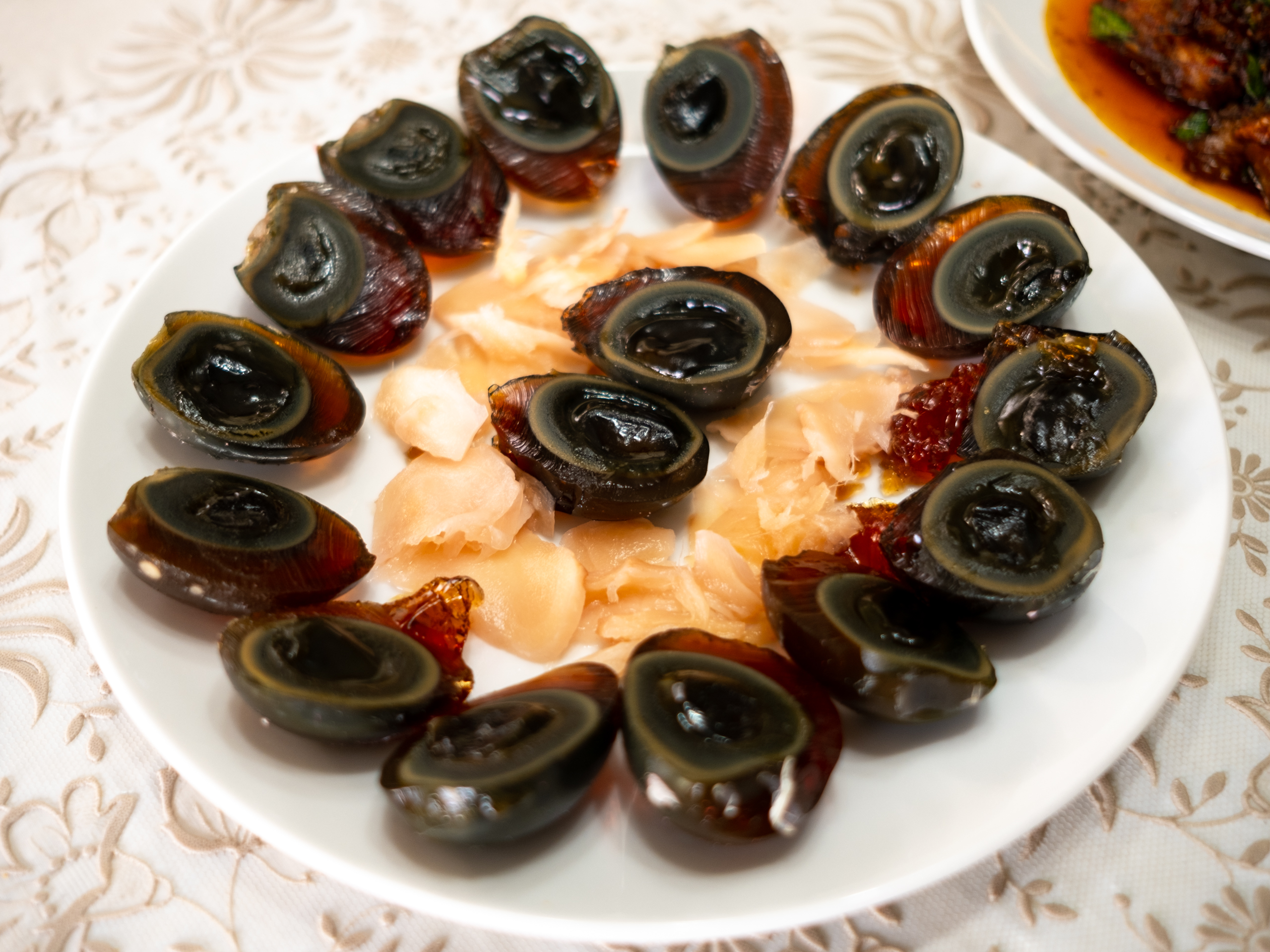

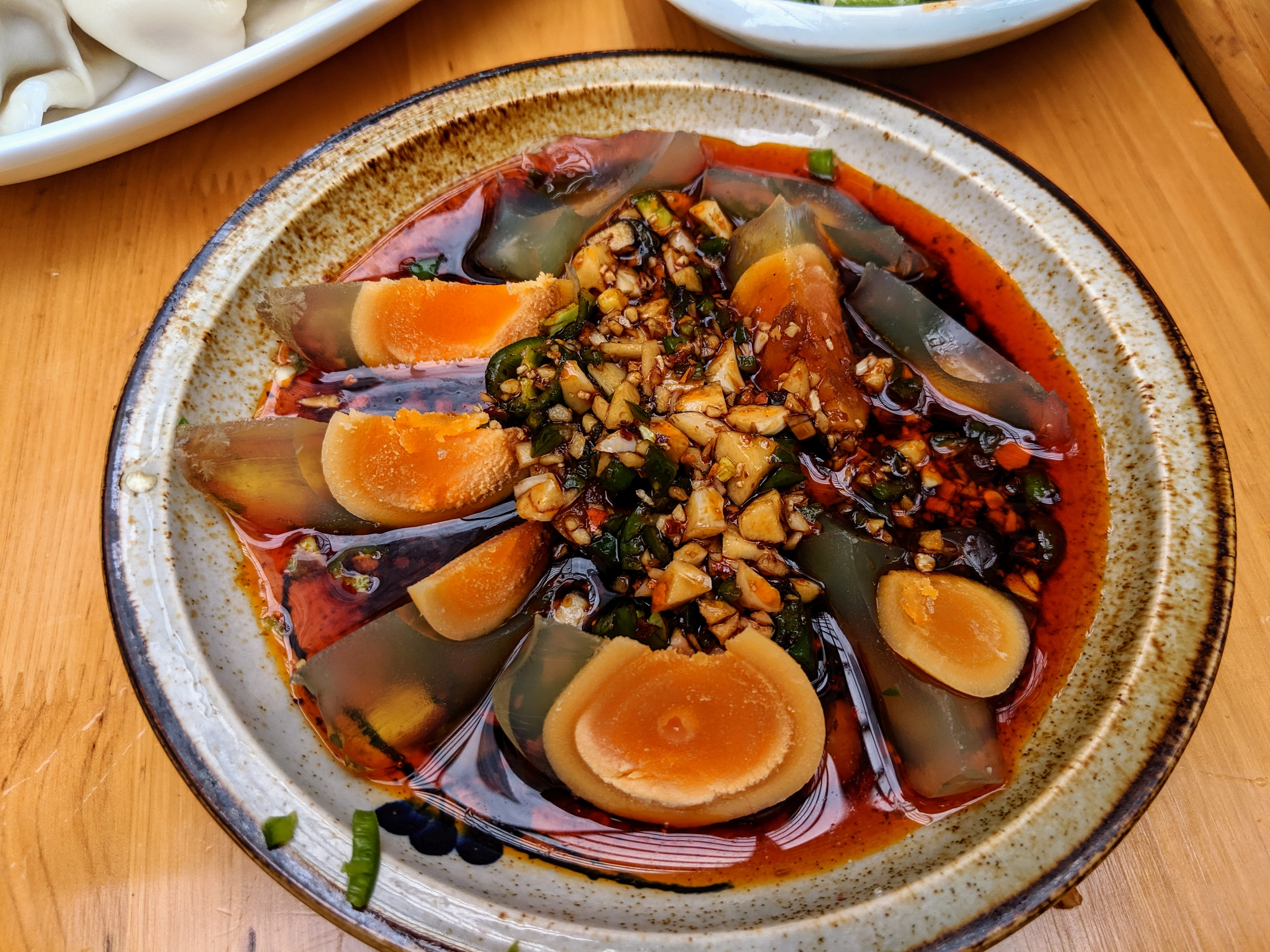
With chili oil

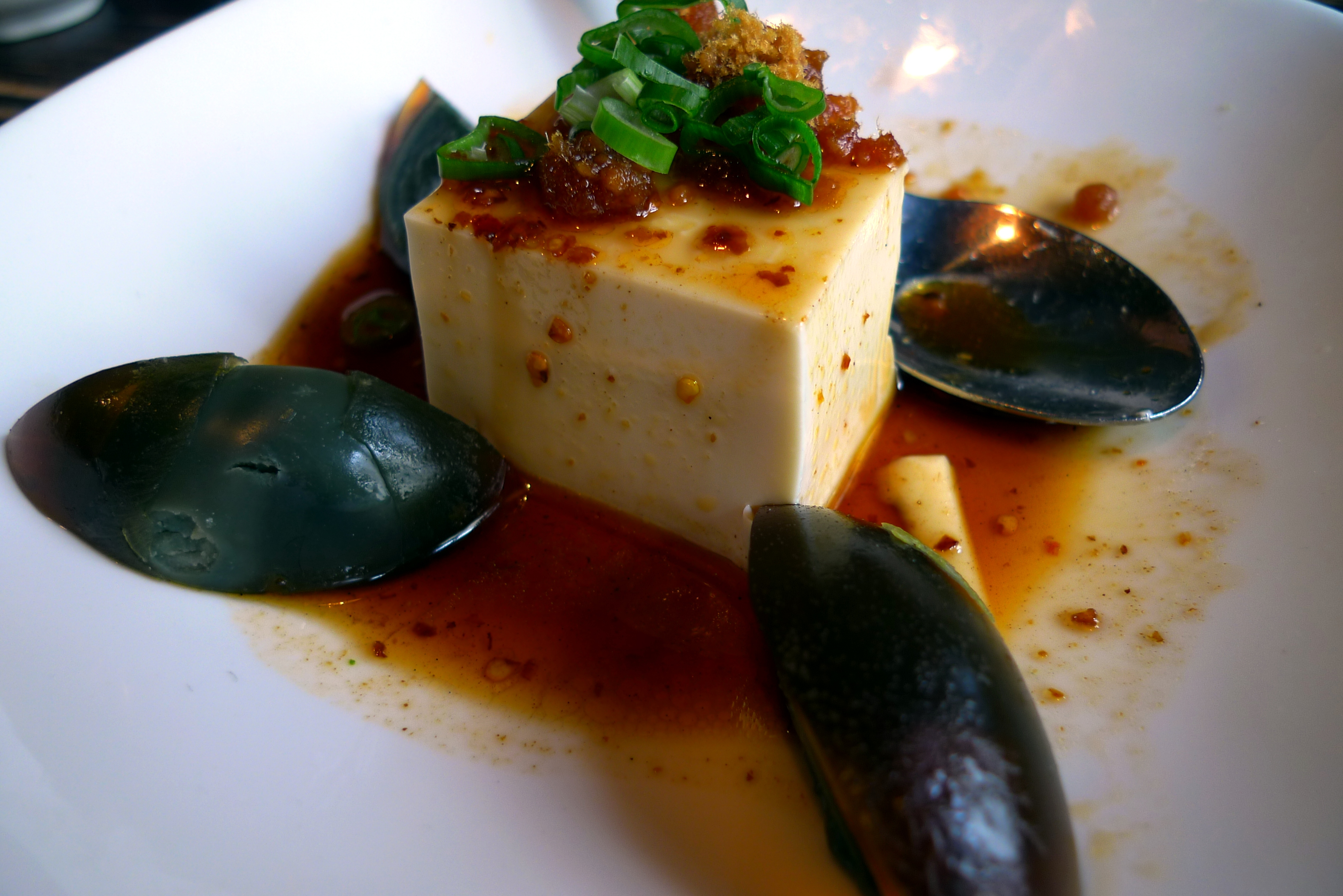
With tofu

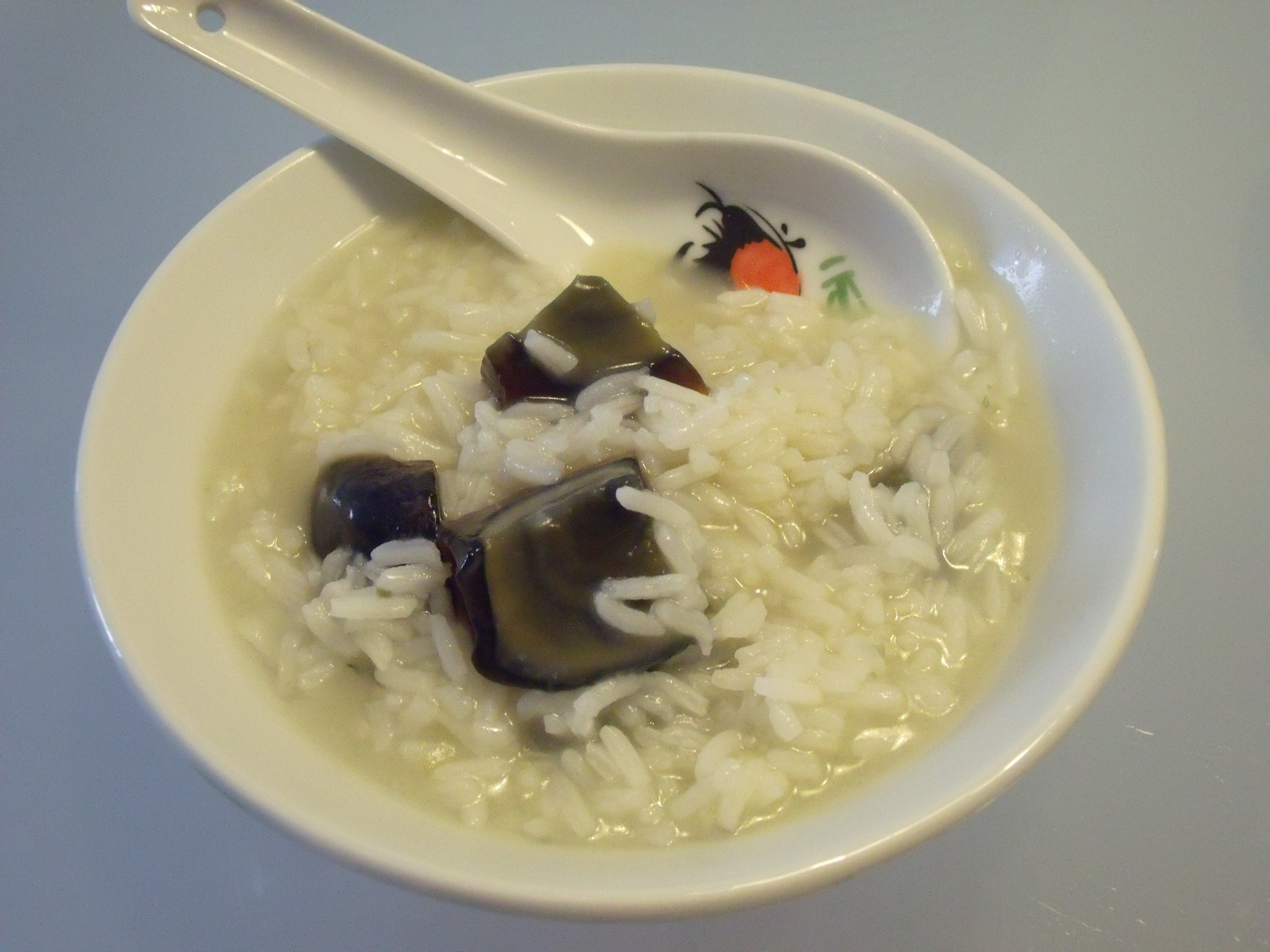
With congee

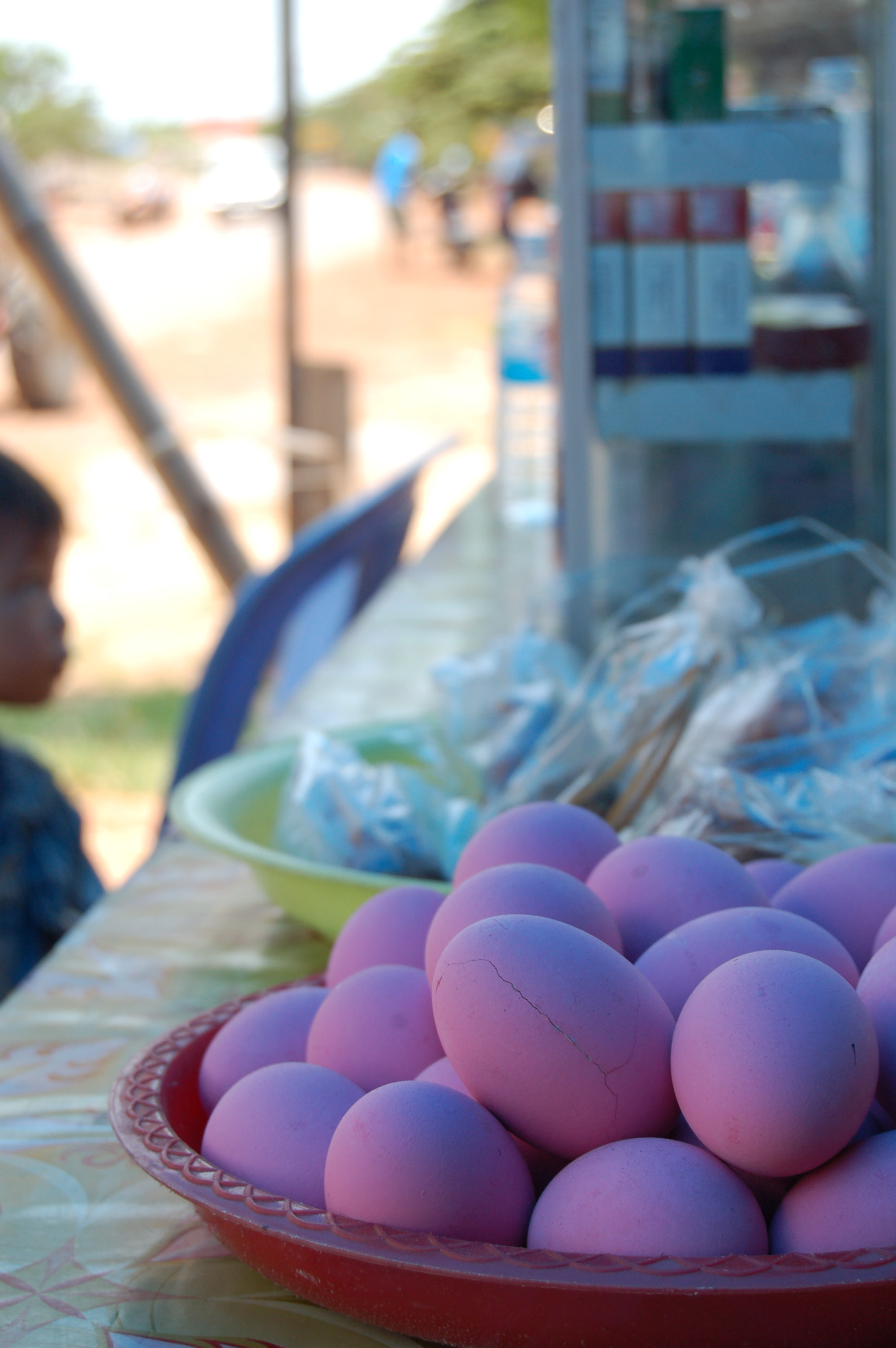
Pink century eggs in Laos

== See also ==
- Balut (food) – Bird embryo eaten from egg shell
- Chinese red eggs – Chicken eggs in Chinese cuisine
- Iron egg – Egg-based dish from Taiwan
- Pickled egg – Hard-boiled eggs cured in vinegar or brine
- Salted duck egg – Traditional Asian dish common in several regions
- Smoked egg – Food that involves the smoking of eggs
- Soy egg – Egg dishes
- Tea egg – Egg boiled in tea as a savory snack
- Virgin boy egg – Traditional dish of Dongyang, Zhejiang, China
