= Pidan =

Pidan may refer to:

- Pi dan or Century egg, a type of preserved egg used in Chinese cuisine
- Pidan (textile), a type of silk cloth used as a tapestry in Cambodia
- Pidan island, a river island in the Yalu river, North Korea
- Pidan Mountain, Primorsky Krai, Russia
- Mount Livadiyskaya, also known as "Pidan" or "Pedan", a mountain in Primorsky Krai, Russia
