= Livadi (disambiguation) =

Livadi or Leivadi (Greek: Λιβάδι or Λειβάδι, "meadow") may refer to several places in Greece:

- Livadi, a town in the Larissa regional unit
- Livadi, Cythera, a village on the island of Cythera
- Livadi, Pieria, a village in the municipality Pydna-Kolindros
- Livadi Serifou, a village on the island of Serifos
- Livadi, Thessaloniki, a village in the Thessaloniki regional unit

== See also ==
- Livadia (disambiguation)
