= Pedan =

Pedan may refer to:

- Mount Pedan, also known as Mount Livadiyskaya, Russia
- Pedan (subdistrict), in Indonesia

== Persons with the surname ==
- Natalia Pedan (born 1979), Ukrainian artist
- Galina Pedan (born 1983), Kyrgyz athlete
- Igor Pedan (active in 2000s), Ukrainian-born Russian strongman
