= Salted duck egg =

Traditional Asian dish common in several regions

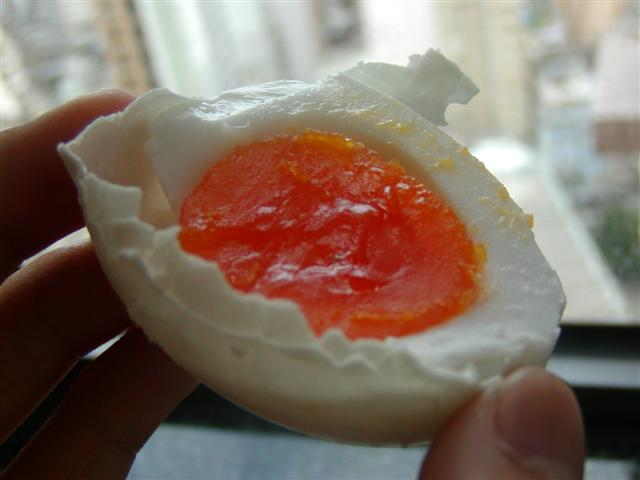
- Place of origin: China
- Main ingredients: Duck egg in brine

Salted duck egg

Chinese name
- Traditional Chinese: 1. 鹹鴨蛋; 2. 鹹蛋
- Simplified Chinese: 1. 咸鸭蛋; 2. 咸蛋
- Literal meaning: 1. salted duck eggs 2. salted eggs
Transcriptions
Standard Mandarin
- Hanyu Pinyin: 1. xiányādàn 2. xiándàn
Yue: Cantonese
- Yale Romanization: 1. hàahm aap daahn 2. hàahm daahn
- Jyutping: 1. haam4 aap3 daan6 2. haam4 daan6

Alternative Chinese name
- Traditional Chinese: 鹹蛋
- Simplified Chinese: 咸蛋
- Literal meaning: salted eggs
Transcriptions
Southern Min
- Hokkien POJ: kiâm-nn̄g

Burmese name
- Burmese: ဆားဘဲဥ

Vietnamese name
- Vietnamese: trứng vịt muối hột vịt muối

Thai name
- Thai: ไข่เค็ม (khị khĕm; Literal meaning: salted egg)

Malay name
- Malay: telur masin

Indonesian name
- Indonesian: telur asin

Filipino name
- Tagalog: itlog na maalat itlog na pula

Khmer name
- Khmer: ពងទាប្រៃ

Kapampangan name
- Kapampangan: ebun malat

Cebuano name
- Cebuano: ginamos nga itlog

A salted duck egg is a Chinese preserved food product made by soaking duck eggs in brine or packing each egg in damp, salted charcoal. From the salt curing process, the salted duck eggs have a briny aroma, a gelatin-like egg white, and a firm-textured, round yolk that is bright orange-red.

Salted duck eggs are normally boiled or steamed before being peeled and eaten as a condiment to congee or cooked with other foods as a flavoring. The egg white has a sharp, salty taste. The orange-red yolk is rich, fatty, and less salty. The yolk is prized and is used in Chinese mooncakes to symbolize the moon.

Salted eggs can also be made from chicken eggs, though the taste and texture will be somewhat different, and the egg yolk will be less rich.

Besides being sold covered in a thick layer of salted charcoal paste, the eggs may also be sold with the salted paste removed, wrapped in plastic, and vacuum-packed.

Salted eggs sold in the Philippines undergo a similar curing process, with some variation in ingredients used. They are dyed red (hence called itlog na pula or ‘red eggs' in English) to distinguish them from fresh duck eggs.

== Thailand ==
Khai khrop, also spelt as kai krob or khai khu, is a traditional food product from Songkhla in Southern Thailand, made by putting two duck egg yolks into an egg shell that was cut into half, then preserved by soaking in brine. Compared to salted duck eggs, they have no egg white and the yolks are softer and less salty.

Khai khrop are steamed until hard before being eaten with rice or khao tom, or cooked with other foods.

== Philippines ==
=== Pateros method ===
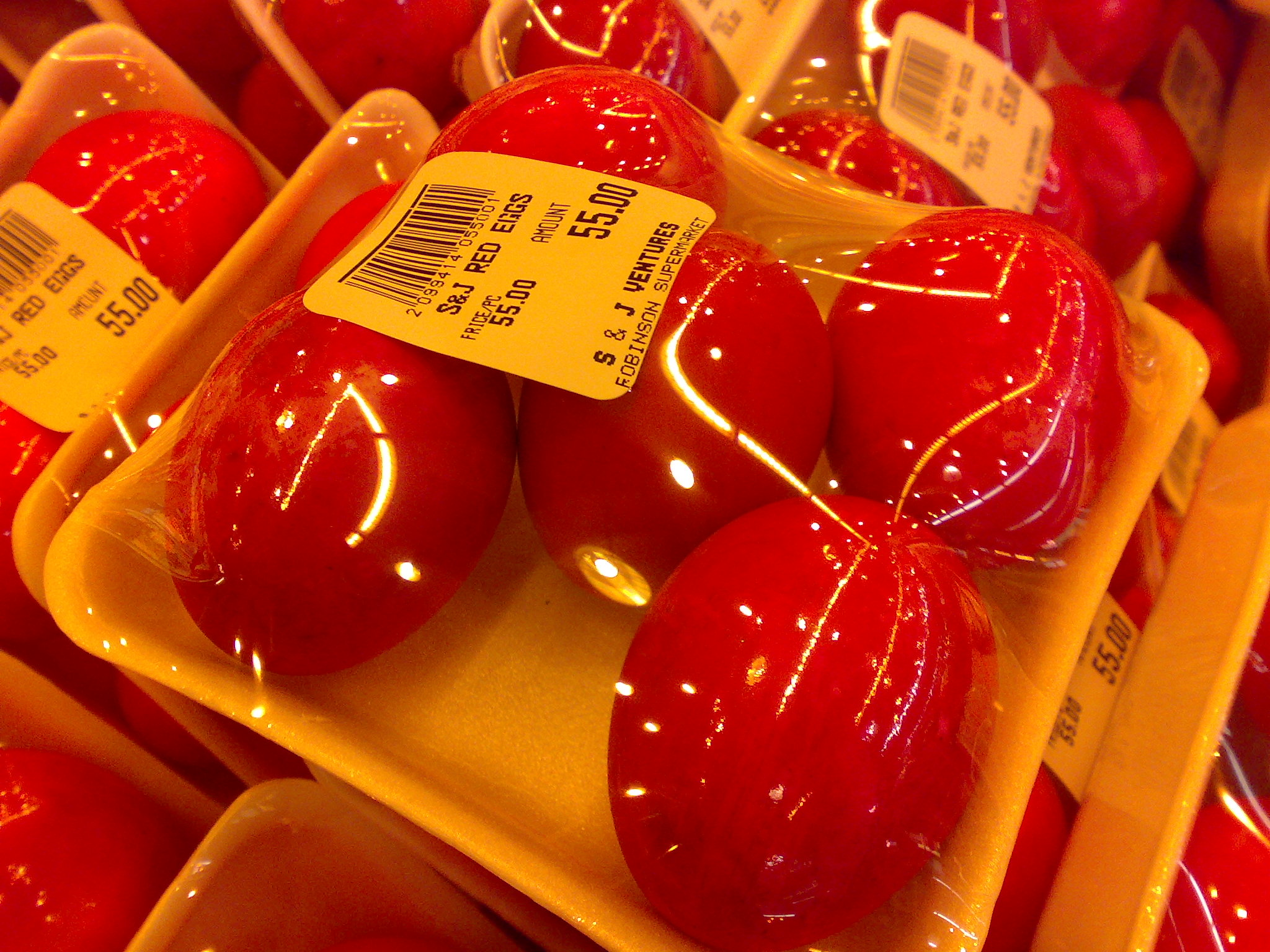
Red salted duck eggs sold in the Philippines

A popular method for processing salted eggs in the Philippines is the Pateros method. The salted egg is prepared "Pateros style" by mixing clay (from ant hills or termite mounds), table salt, and water in a ratio of 1:1:2 until the mixture becomes smooth and forms a thick texture similar to cake batter. The fresh, uncooked eggs are individually dipped in the admixture, and packed in 150-egg batches in newspaper-lined 250 mm × 300 mm × 460 mm (10 in × 12 in × 18 in) wooden boxes (often residual boxes of dried fish packing). The whole batch is then lightly wrapped in newspapers to slow down the dehydration process.

The eggs are then stored indoors at room temperature over the next 12 to 14 days to cure, the salt equilibrating in the batch by osmosis. Curing can last up to 18 days, resulting in very long-lasting red eggs that can have a 40-day shelf life, but this is largely unnecessary, as the eggs are stocked and replenished biweekly.

After the two-week curing period, the eggs are hand-cleaned with water and a brush and prepared to be boiled in low heat for 30 minutes. Time is measured from the first moment the water boils and the eggs are immersed. A 50-egg batch is then wrapped in fish nets for ease of removal from the cookware, which must be large enough to accommodate the batch with a 50 mm (2 in) covering of water.

Chicken eggs may be processed the same way, although up to 10% of the batch can break during the process.

== See also ==
- Balut
- Century egg
- Chinese red eggs
- List of egg dishes
- Smoked egg
- Tea egg
