= Livadiya =

Livadiya may refer to:

- Livadiya, Crimea, an urban-type settlement in Crimea
- Livadiya, Primorsky Krai, a former urban settlement in Primorsky Krai, Russia, part of the city of Nakhodka
