= Livadia =

Livadia can refer to:

== Places ==
=== Crimea ===
- Livadiya, Crimea (Лівадія or Ливадия), a suburb of Yalta, Crimea

=== Cyprus ===
- Livadia, Famagusta, a village in Cyprus
- Livadia, Larnaca, a village in Cyprus
- Livadia, Nicosia, a village in Cyprus

=== Greece ===
- Livadeia (Λιβαδειά), a city in Boeotia, Greece
- Livadia, Andros, a village on the island of Andros, Greece
- Livadia, Astypalaia, a settlement on the island of Astypalaia
- Livadia, Kilkis (Λιβάδια), a community in Kilkis regional unit, Greece
- Livadia, Paros, a settlement on the island of Paros
- Livadia, Rethymno (Λιβάδια), a community in Rethymno regional unit, Greece
- Livadia, Tilos, a settlement on the island of Tilos

=== Romania ===
- Livadia, a village in Baru Commune, Hunedoara County, Romania
- Livadia, a village in the town of Băile Olănești, Vâlcea County, Romania

=== Russia ===
- Livadiya, Primorsky Krai, a suburb of Nakhodka, Russia, near Mount Livadiyskaya
- Livadia Range in the Sikhote-Alin mountains in the Russian Far East
- Mount Livadiyskaya in the Sikhote-Alin mountains in the Russian Far East

== Buildings ==
- Livadia Palace, Livadia, Crimea

== Ships ==
- Russian yacht Livadia (1873), a Russian yacht completed in 1873 and wrecked in 1878
- Russian yacht Livadia (1880), a Russian yacht completed in 1880 and written off in 1926

== See also ==
- Livadica, Podujevo, a village in Kosovo
