= Vostok Bay =

Bay of the Sea of Japan

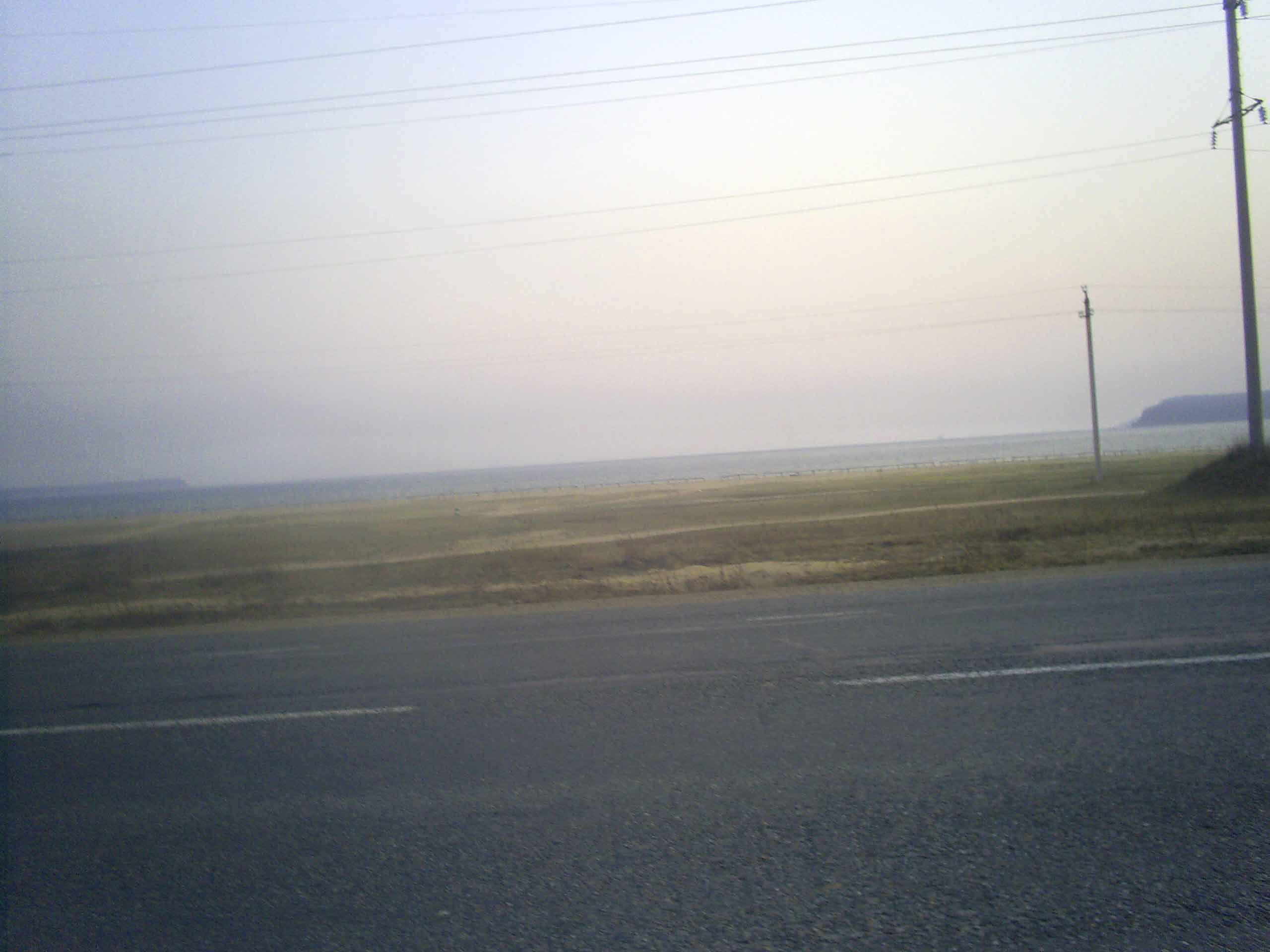
Vostok Bay, viewing from Volchanets.

Vostok Bay (Russian: залив Восток, 42°52′33″N 132°44′35″E) is a small (15 km × 6 km or 9.3 mi × 3.7 mi) bay in Sea of Japan to the west of Trudny Peninsula. It is a part of Peter the Great Gulf.

The bay is a shallow but its fauna is rich. Vostok Bay Sea Wildlife Preserve was founded in 1989.

Vostok Bay has no ecological problems and it is a summer recreation area.

The main settlements on coast are Nakhodka (suburbs Priiskovy, Livadiya and Yuzhno-Morskoy) and Volchanets.
