= Ageh (food) =

Taiwanese dish

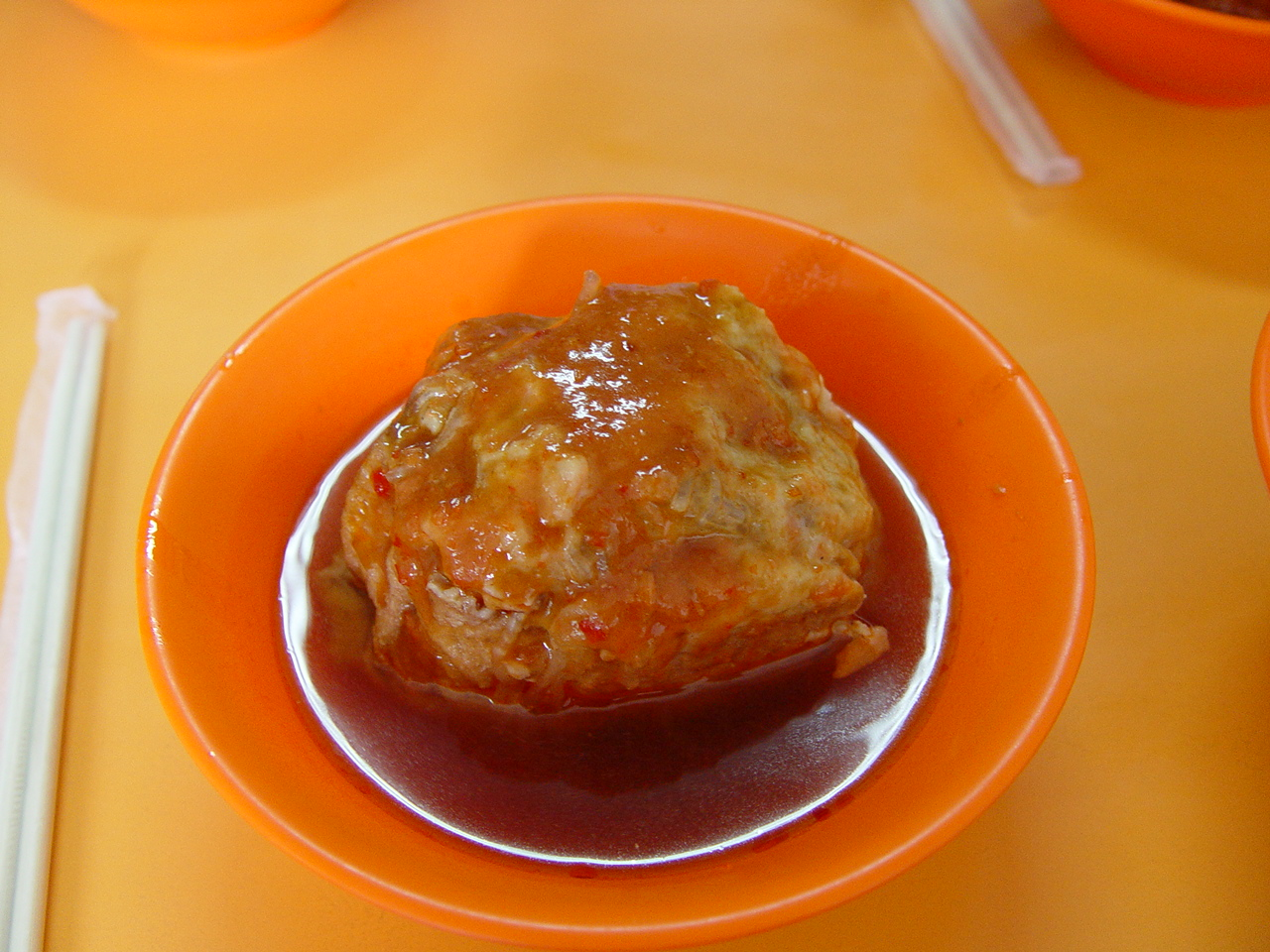
A serving of a-gei

Ageh (Chinese: 阿給; Pe̍h-ōe-jī: á-geh) or Tamsui ageh (Chinese: 淡水阿給; Pe̍h-ōe-jī: Tām-súi á-geh) is a speciality food originating from Tamsui District of New Taipei City and consists of a piece of fried tofu, stuffed with cooked cellophane noodles, and sealed with surimi, which is widely sold by vendors in the district. The name ageh was derived from aburaage (aburaage (油揚げ), age (あげ)), a fried and stewed Japanese tofu packet from which the ageh is made.

== Culture ==
The ageh was reportedly created in 1965 by Iông-tēⁿ Gím-bûn (楊鄭錦文), who combined various food items sold at her Chin-lí street (真理街) food stall to sell as a new food item. This original ageh consisted of fried tofu that has been emptied of its center, stuffed with cellophane noodles cooked in stewed ground pork, its opening sealed and covered with a carrot and surimi mixture, and then steamed to completion. The dish incorporates several techniques from other dishes, including the stuffing of abura-age in the manner of inarizushi, the capping of tofu with surimi to make Yong Tau Foo, and the use of cellophane noodles as a filling for many stuffed pastries.

The individual a-gei are served with either a plain soy-based or a sweet chili sauce. A-gei is commonly eaten with a bowl of stuffed fish ball soup in the winter and a glass of cold soy milk in the summer.

== Vendors ==
Well known vendors of a-gei in Tamsui include:

- Original store a-gei (老店阿給)
- Three sisters a-gei (三姊妹阿給)
- Wenhua a-gei (文化阿給)

== See also ==
- Taiwanese cuisine
- Iron egg
- Tea egg
- List of stuffed dishes
