= Iron egg =

Egg-based dish from Taiwan

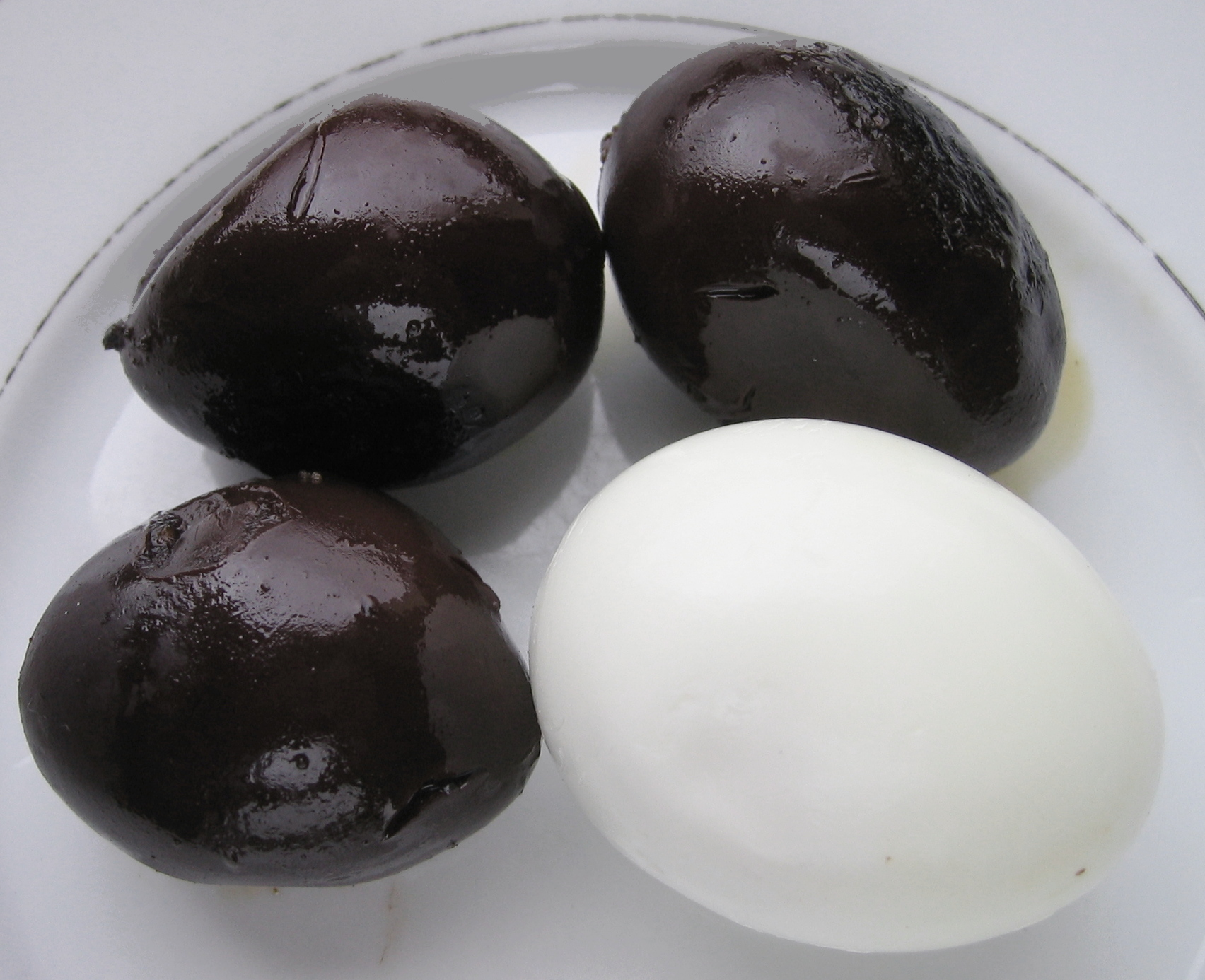
Three black iron eggs, compared to a cooked and peeled chicken egg

Iron egg (Chinese: 鐵蛋; pinyin: tiědàn) is a special version of soy egg, a snack from Taiwan. They are considered a delicacy and originated in the Tamsui District of New Taipei City.

The dish consists of small eggs that have been repeatedly stewed in a mix of spices and air-dried. The resulting eggs are dark brown on the outside, chewy in texture, and very flavourful compared to standard boiled eggs. It has been said to taste "sweet, spicy and slightly salty with a concentrated egg flavour—a great snack with drinks".

Iron eggs were popularized by shopkeeper Yang Bi-yun (楊碧雲), who opened the first store selling the product in Tamsui in 1980. She claimed her eggs were invented by accident when, on a slow day at her snack stall, she had to continually recook soy eggs (滷蛋) to keep them warm after taking them out of the soy sauce broth. The recooking and drying process eventually resulted in shrunken eggs that were dark, flavourful, and chewy, which were extremely popular with the locals. Yang eventually founded a new business based on her iron egg recipe, packaging and selling them under the brand Apotiedan (阿婆鐵蛋; 'Grandma's iron eggs'). Although Yang maintained that her iron egg was the original, a Tamsui local legend claims a noodle stall owner named Huang Chang-nian (黃張哖) invented the iron egg in the 1970s.

Iron eggs can only be created by the use of "chicken, pigeon or quail eggs" but not from duck eggs. Quail eggs are very popular. The popularity of iron eggs has risen and they can be found in other regions besides Taiwan, such as in Africa and the Middle East.

== See also ==
- A-gei – Taiwanese dish
- Smoked egg – Food that involves the smoking of eggs
- Taiwanese cuisine – Culinary traditions of Taiwan
- Tea egg – Egg boiled in tea as a savory snack
