= Tea egg =

Egg boiled in tea as a savory snack

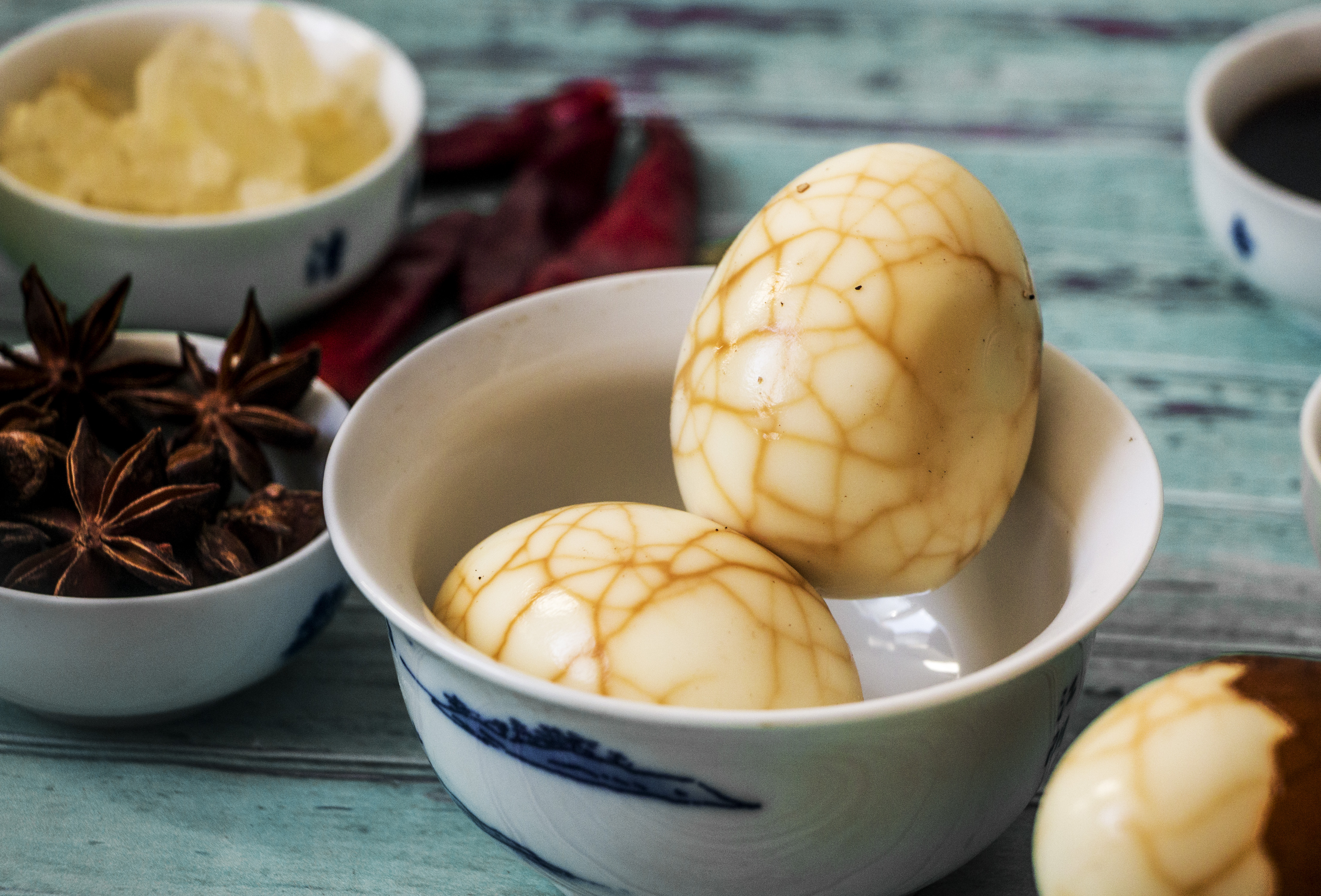
- Course: Snack
- Place of origin: China
- Region or state: Zhejiang
- Main ingredients: Egg, five-spice powder, tea

Tea egg
- Traditional Chinese: 茶葉蛋
- Simplified Chinese: 茶叶蛋
- Literal meaning: "tea leaf egg"
Transcriptions
Standard Mandarin
- Hanyu Pinyin: chá yè dàn
- IPA: [ʈʂʰǎ.jê.tân]
Yue: Cantonese
- Jyutping: caa4 jip6 daan2
- IPA: [tsʰa˩ jip̚˨ tan˧˥]

Alternative Chinese name
- Traditional Chinese: 茶葉卵
Transcriptions
Southern Min
- Hokkien POJ: tê-hio̍h-nn̄g

Tea egg is a Chinese savory food commonly sold as a snack, in which a boiled egg is cracked slightly and then boiled again in tea, and sauce or spices. It is also known as marble egg because cracks in the egg shell create darkened lines with marble-like patterns. Commonly sold by street vendors or in night markets in most Chinese communities throughout the world, it is also served in Asian restaurants. Although it originated from China and is traditionally associated with Chinese cuisine, other similar recipes and variations have been developed throughout Asia. Tea eggs originated in Zhejiang province as a way to preserve food for a long time but are now found in all provinces.

== Preparation ==
=== Traditional method ===
Fragrant and flavorful tea eggs are a traditional Chinese food. The original recipe uses various spices, soy sauce, and black tea leaves. A commonly used spice for flavoring tea eggs is Chinese five-spice powder, which contains ground cinnamon, star anise, fennel seeds, cloves and Sichuan pepper. Some recipes do not use tea leaves, but they are still called "tea eggs". In the traditional method of preparation, eggs are boiled until they reach a hardened, cooked state. The boiled eggs are removed from the water, and the entire shell of each egg is gently cracked all around. The cracking method is the formal feature in this traditional egg recipe. Smaller cracks produce more marbling, visible when the egg is peeled for eating. The extra water from the boiling is allowed to seep out of the eggs on its own. After about ten minutes, the cracked eggs are ready to be put into the prepared spiced-tea liquid and simmered over medium heat. This simmering allows the spiced fluid to seep into the cracks and marinate the eggs inside their shells. After about twenty minutes, the eggs and liquid are transferred to a glass or ceramic container for further steeping in a refrigerator. For best results, the eggs are allowed to steep for at least several hours. The dark color of the spiced tea gives the egg a marbled effect when it is peeled to be eaten.

=== Quick method ===
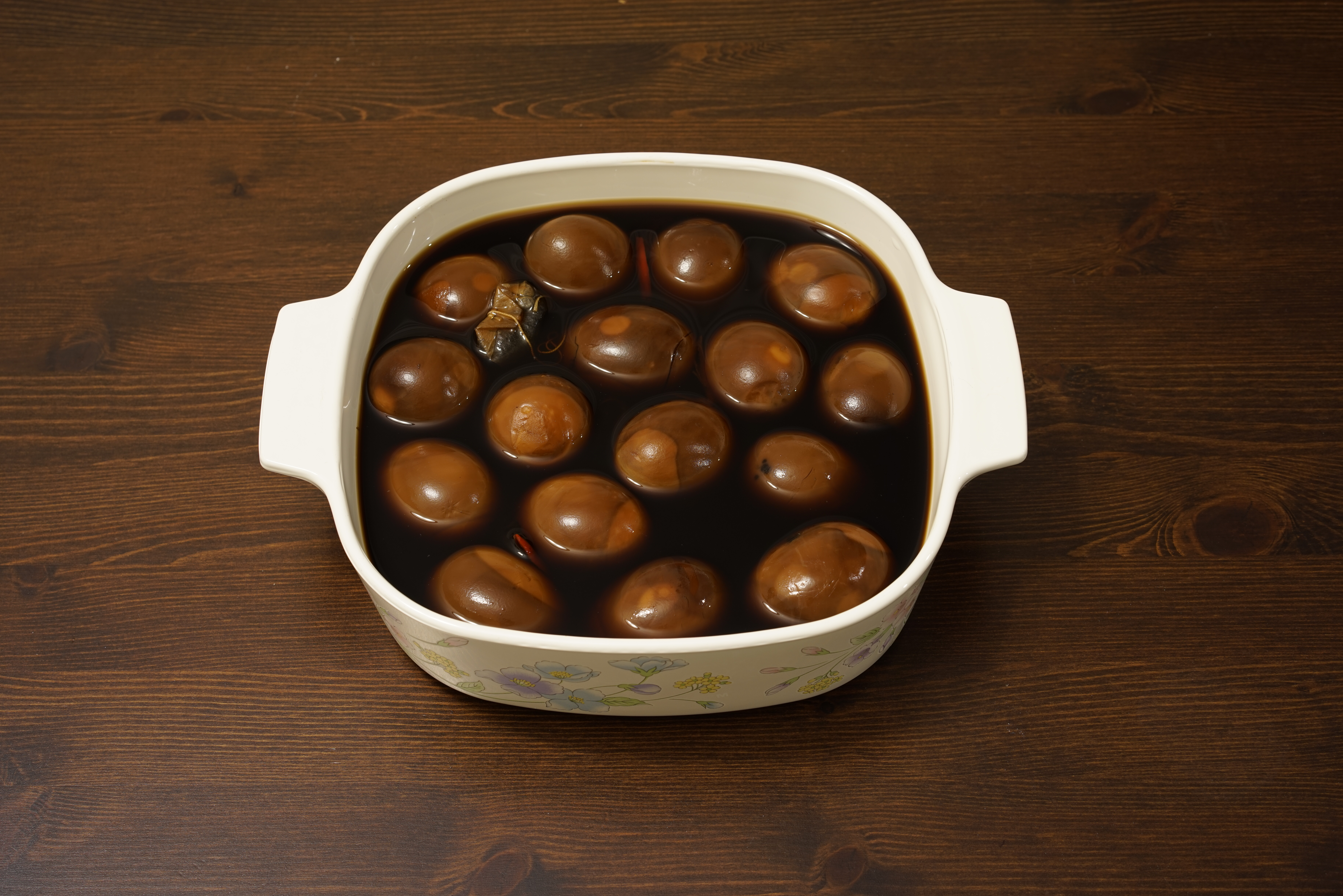
In the quick method, the shell is removed before steeping.

Another method of making tea eggs is to boil the eggs until fully cooked inside, then remove the hard-boiled eggs from their shells and let them steep in the spiced tea mixture at low heat for a little longer. The eggs and liquid are removed from the heat and transferred to a glass or ceramic container for further steeping. This method requires a shorter steeping time than the traditional method; however, the egg is less visually appealing without the marbled effect from the traditional cracked-shell method of preparation. The eggs can be eaten at any time. The longer they are allowed to steep, the richer the flavor will be. The ideal spiced tea egg has a balance between the egg's natural flavor and that of the spices.

This form of tea egg is very similar to the soy egg.

== Appearance and flavor ==
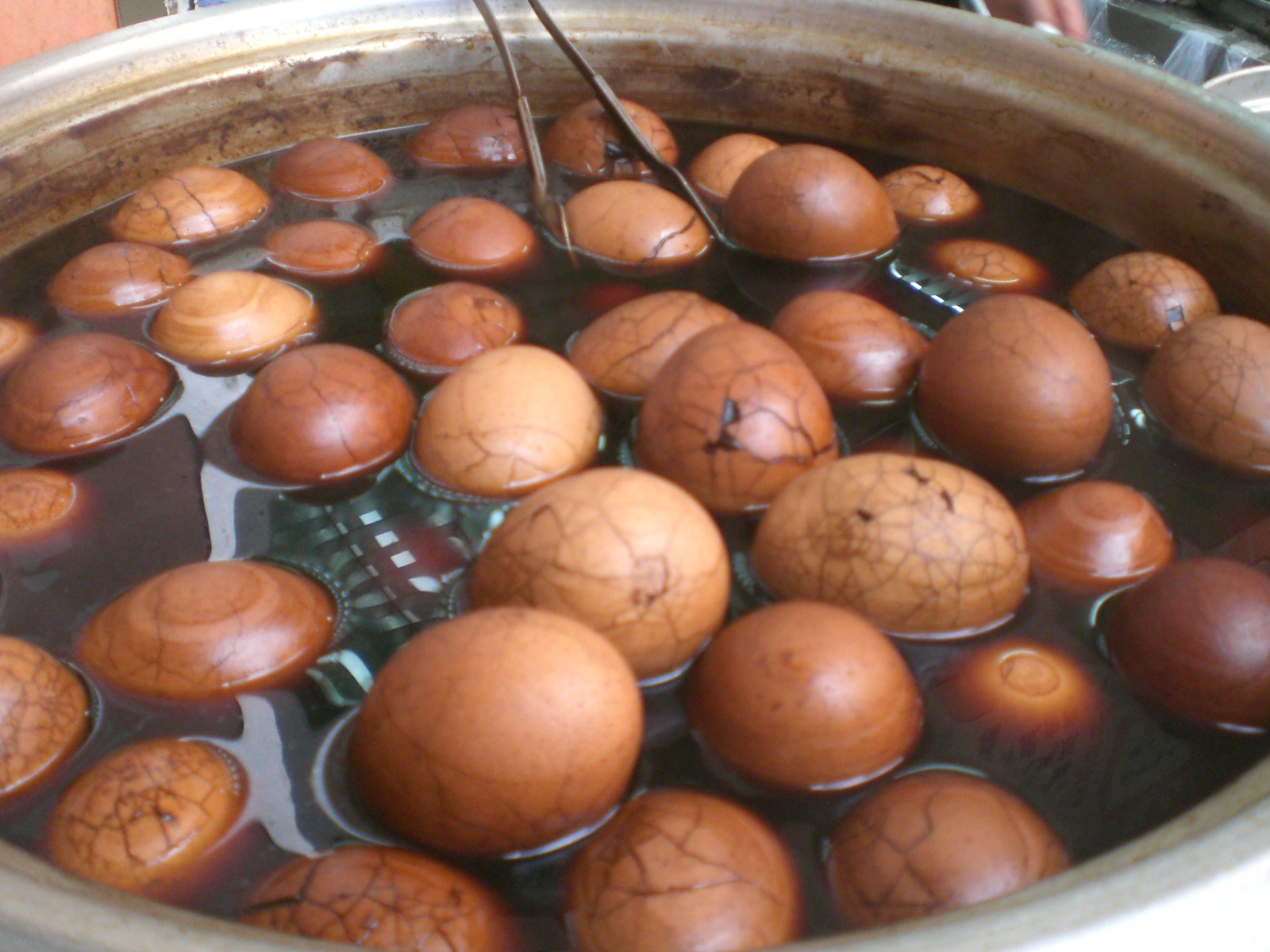
A batch of tea eggs with shells still attached, soaking in a brew of spices and tea

When the shell is peeled off, the egg has regions of light and dark brown, with a mid-brownish tone along the cracks of the shell. The yolk is yellow all the way through, though overcooked eggs will have a thin, harmless greyish layer while the core is the usual yellow. The flavor depends on the tea (type and strength) and variety of spices used. Five-spice powder adds a savory, slightly salty tone to the egg white, and the tea brings out the yolk's flavor.

== Regional ==
=== China ===
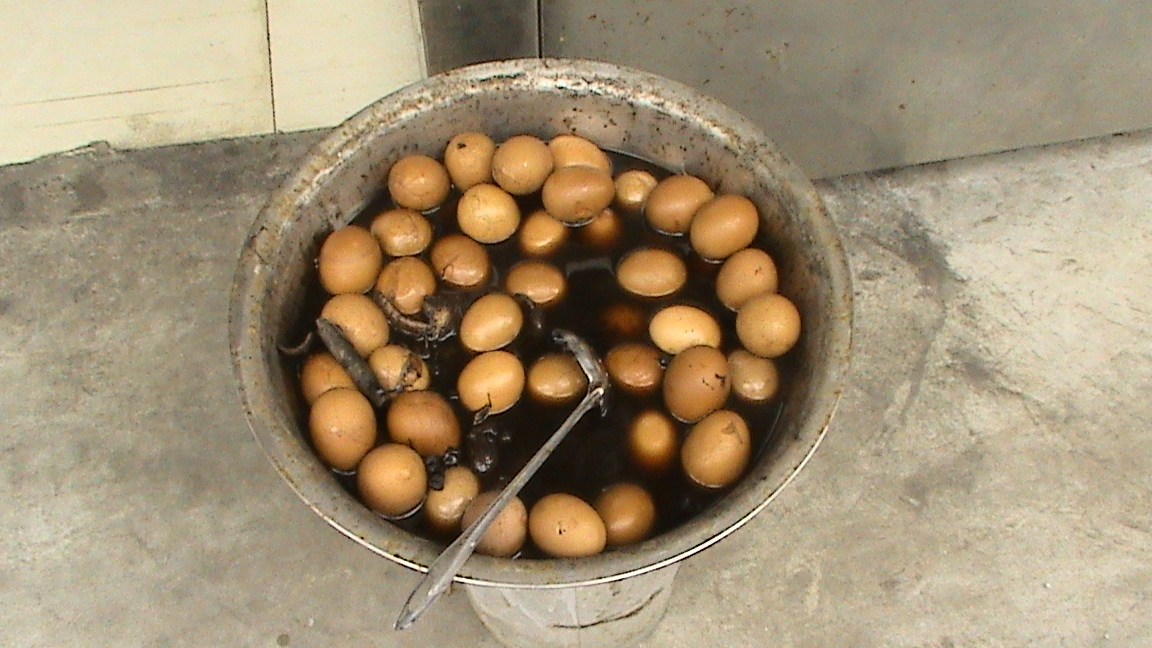
Tea eggs in a metal bowl over heat source.

In China, tea eggs are a household treat. They are also sold in stores, restaurants, and from street vendors. It is deemed a popular street food that usually costs about 2 yuan.

=== Taiwan ===
In Taiwan, tea eggs are a fixture of convenience stores. Through 7-Eleven chains alone, an average of 40 million tea eggs are sold per year. In recent years, major producers of tea eggs have branched out into fruit and other flavored eggs, such as raspberry, blueberry and salted duck egg.

=== Indonesia ===
In Indonesia, tea eggs have been adopted into native Indonesian cuisine as telur pindang and the ingredients have also been slightly changed. The telur pindang is hard-boiled eggs boiled with spices, salt and soy sauce. However, instead of black tea, the Indonesian version uses leftover shallot skins, teak leaves, or guava leaves as dark brownish coloring agents. Telur pindang is commonly found in Indonesia, but it is more prevalent in Java and South Sumatra. The telur pindang is often served as part of tumpeng, nasi kuning, or nasi campur. In Yogyakarta, telur pindang is often served with nasi gudeg or just hot steamed rice.

=== Malaysia ===
Telur pindang (the Malaysian variation of the tea egg recipe) is said to have its roots in the state of Johor, where the cuisine is most popular, but it can also be found in other parts of the Malay Peninsula. The dish even has sub-variations of the traditional Johorean recipe in many other southern regions. Telur pindang is an occasional cuisine, requiring time and resource-consuming work, and would only be served on special occasions such as weddings. Today, however, there are many commercial telur pindang suppliers nationwide.

== See also ==
- Balut – Bird embryo eaten from egg shell
- Century egg – Chinese egg-based culinary dish
- Chinese red eggs – Chicken eggs in Chinese cuisine
- Iron egg – Egg-based dish from Taiwan
- List of Chinese dishes
- List of egg dishes
- Smoked egg – Food that involves the smoking of eggs
- Telur pindang – Indonesian hard-boiled eggs
