= Priiskovy =

Priiskovy (Russian: Приисковый; masculine), Priiskovaya (Приисковая; feminine), or Priiskovoye (Приисковое; neuter) is the name of several inhabited localities in Russia.

== Urban localities ==
- Priiskovy, Zabaykalsky Krai, an urban-type settlement in Nerchinsky District of Zabaykalsky Krai

== Rural localities ==
- Priiskovy, Sverdlovsk Oblast, a settlement under the administrative jurisdiction of the City of Yekaterinburg in Sverdlovsk Oblast
- Priiskovoye, a selo in Priiskovy Selsoviet of Ordzhonikidzevsky District of the Republic of Khakassia
