= Just One Cookbook =

Japanese recipe food blog

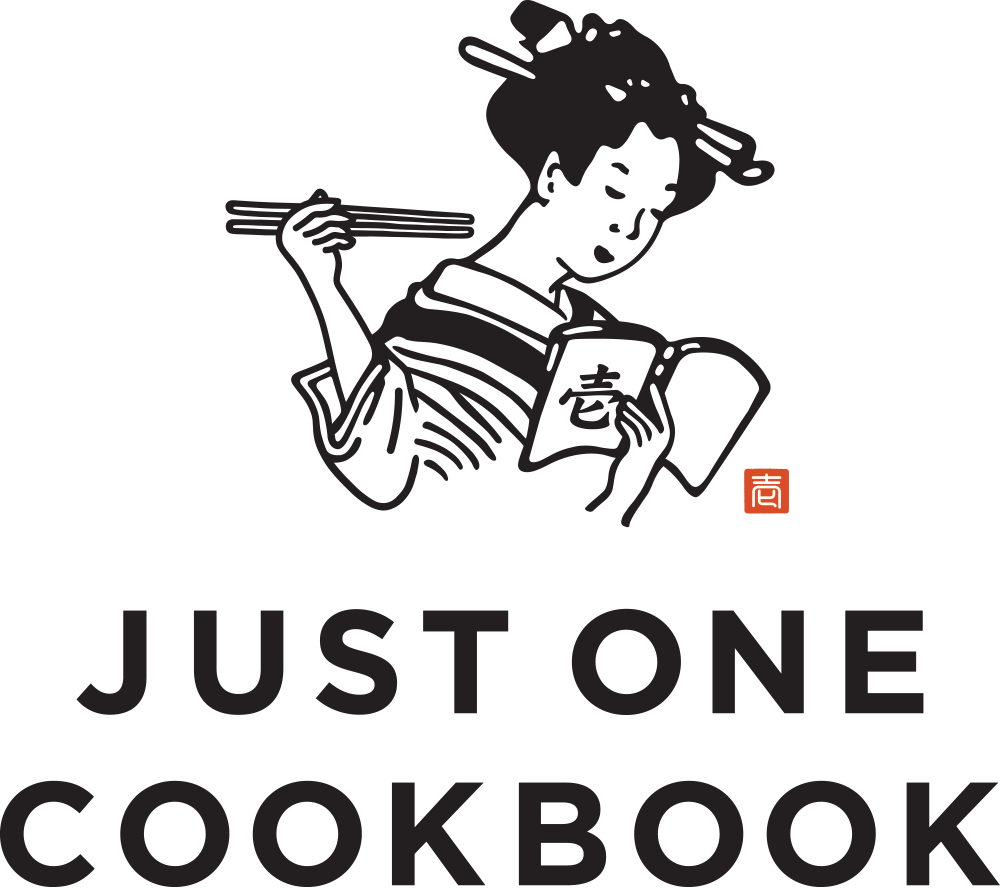

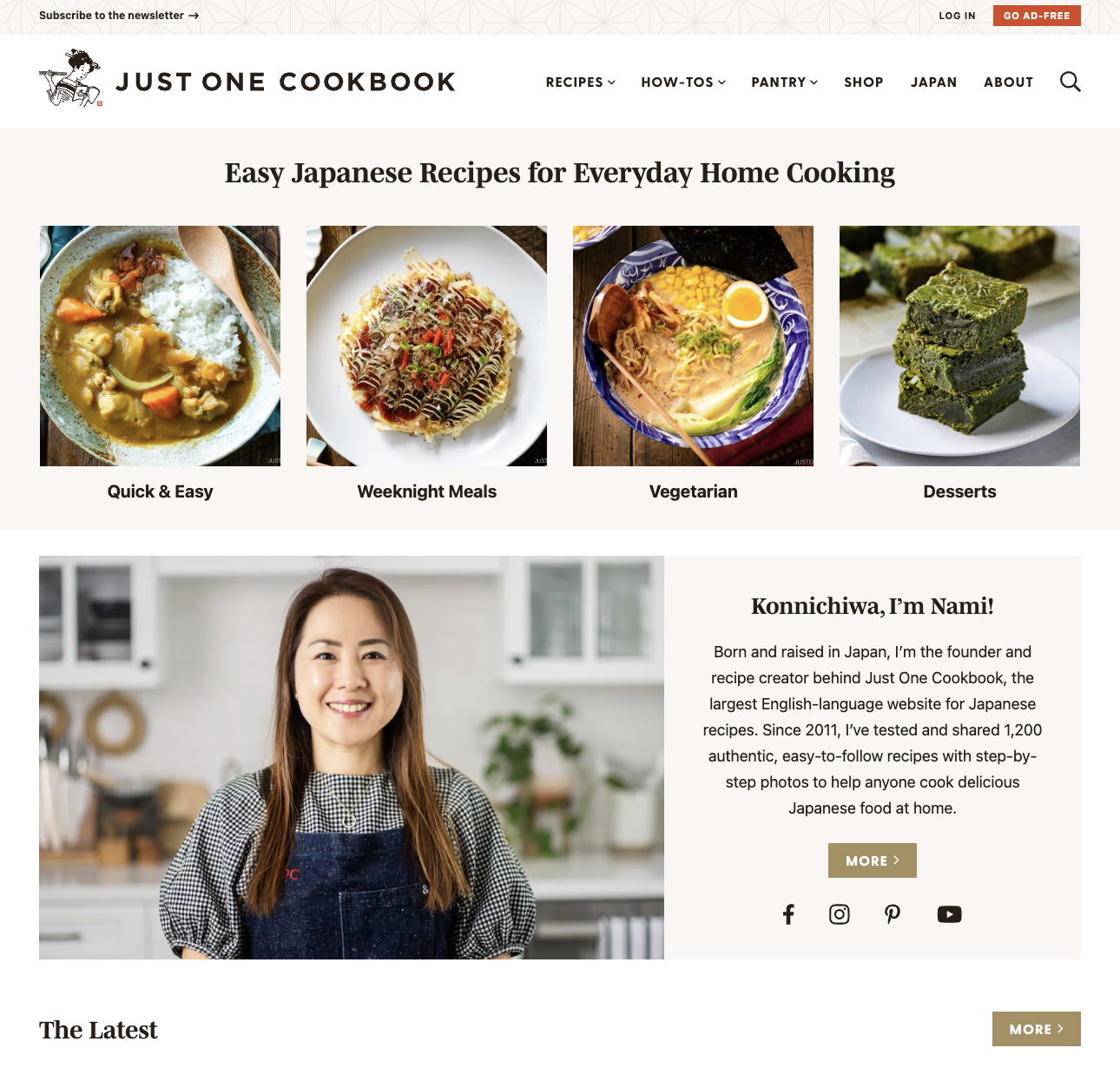
- Screenshot Main page of Just One Cookbook on April 24, 2026
- Website type: Food blog
- Available in: English
- Creators: Namiko Hirasawa Chen; Shen Wen Chen
- Website: justonecookbook.com
- Launched: January 1, 2011; 15 years ago
- Current status: Active

Just One Cookbook (JOC) is a Japanese recipe blog written in English and created by Namiko (Nami) Hirasawa Chen (Japanese: 平澤菜美子, Hirasawa Namiko).

Chen is a home cook who began the food blog in 2011 as a way to share recipes for simple Japanese dishes in English with friends and to preserve family recipes for her children.

== Early life ==
Chen was born in Osaka, Japan and raised in Yokohama, Japan. She learned to cook from her mother.

She moved to the United States at age 20 to attend college. After graduating, she worked as a digital map specialist and met Shen Wen Chen, a colleague at her company. They eventually married and settled in the San Francisco Bay Area in California.

== Content ==
Chen develops, tests, and publishes traditional and modern Japanese recipes for home cooking. She chose the blog's name because she "wanted to transfer all [her] Japanese recipes to English and store it in just one cookbook, on the website."

The website also has information about Japanese pantry items and substitutions for hard-to-find Japanese ingredients. The recipes feature step-by-step photos for each recipe instruction in the preparation and cooking process.

In 2024, the blog launched JOC Goods, which sells artisanal tableware and kitchenware from Japan. The following year they launched JOC Japan Travel, which provides travel guides, sample itineraries, accommodation and dining recommendations, transportation advice, and information on local customs.

== Reception ==
In 2022, Just One Cookbook had 5 million visits per month.

== Books ==
Chen has published three books of recipe collections:

- Just One Cookbook Essential Japanese Recipes
- Just One Cookbook Essential Japanese Recipes Vol. 2
- Just One Cookbook Essential Japanese Recipes Vol. 3: Osechi Japanese New Year Recipes

== Recognition ==
- Finalist, Best Food Video, 2017 SAVEUR Blog Awards
