= Livadiya, Primorsky Krai =

Former urban settlement in Primorsky Krai

Coordinates: 42°52′N 132°40′E

Livadiya (Russian: Лива́дия) was an urban-type settlement in Primorsky Krai, Russia, located on the west coast of Vostok Bay. On December 1, 2004 it was merged with the city of Nakhodka. Population: 12,961 (2002 census); 12,319 (1989 Soviet census).

Livadiya was founded in 1941.
