= Chinese red eggs =

Chicken eggs in Chinese cuisine

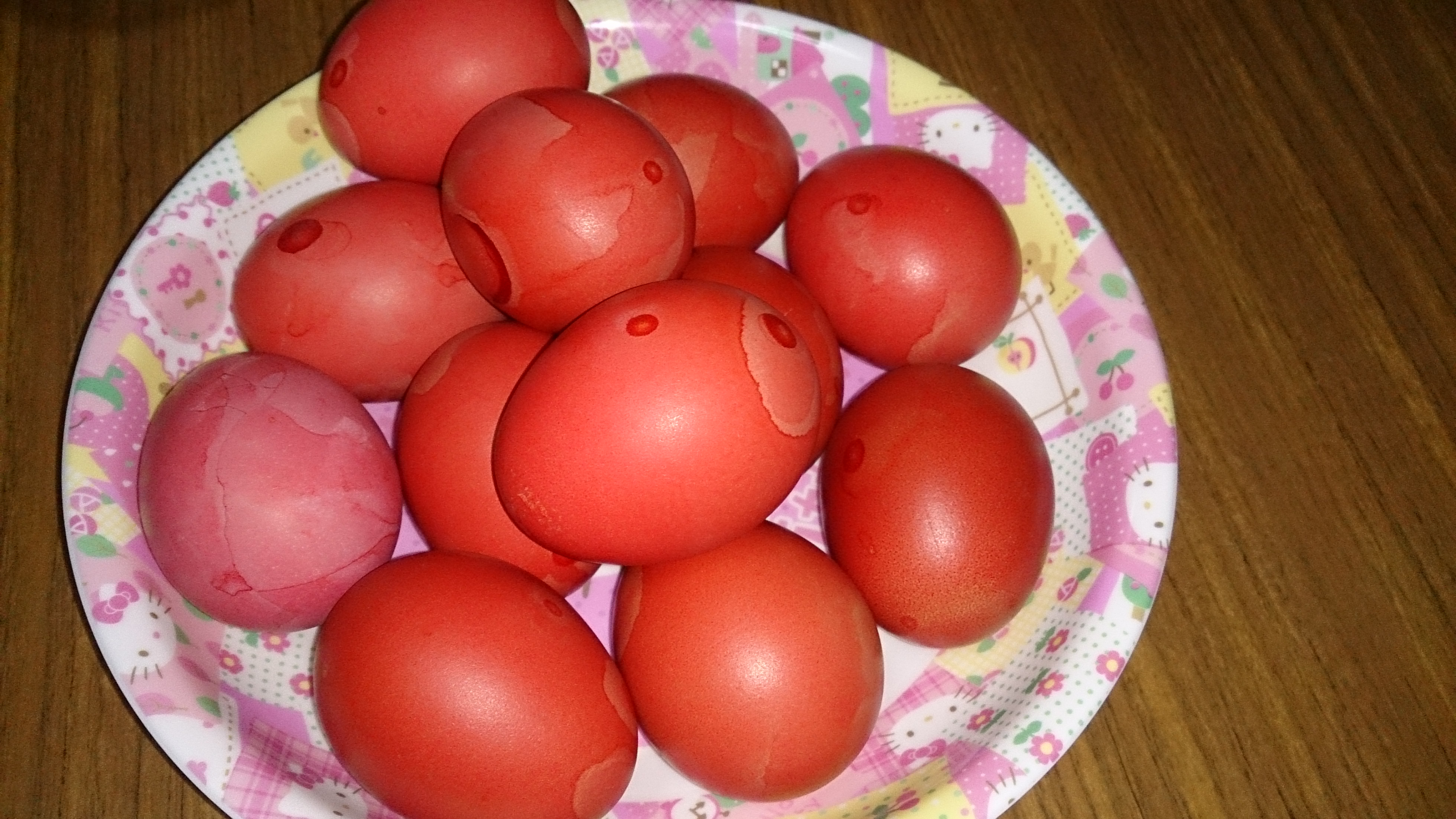
Chinese red eggs

Chinese red eggs (紅蛋, 紅雞蛋; lit. red eggs) are bright pink hard-boiled chicken eggs used in Chinese cuisine. After boiling, a wet red calligraphy paper is wiped over the eggs to create a pink coloring.

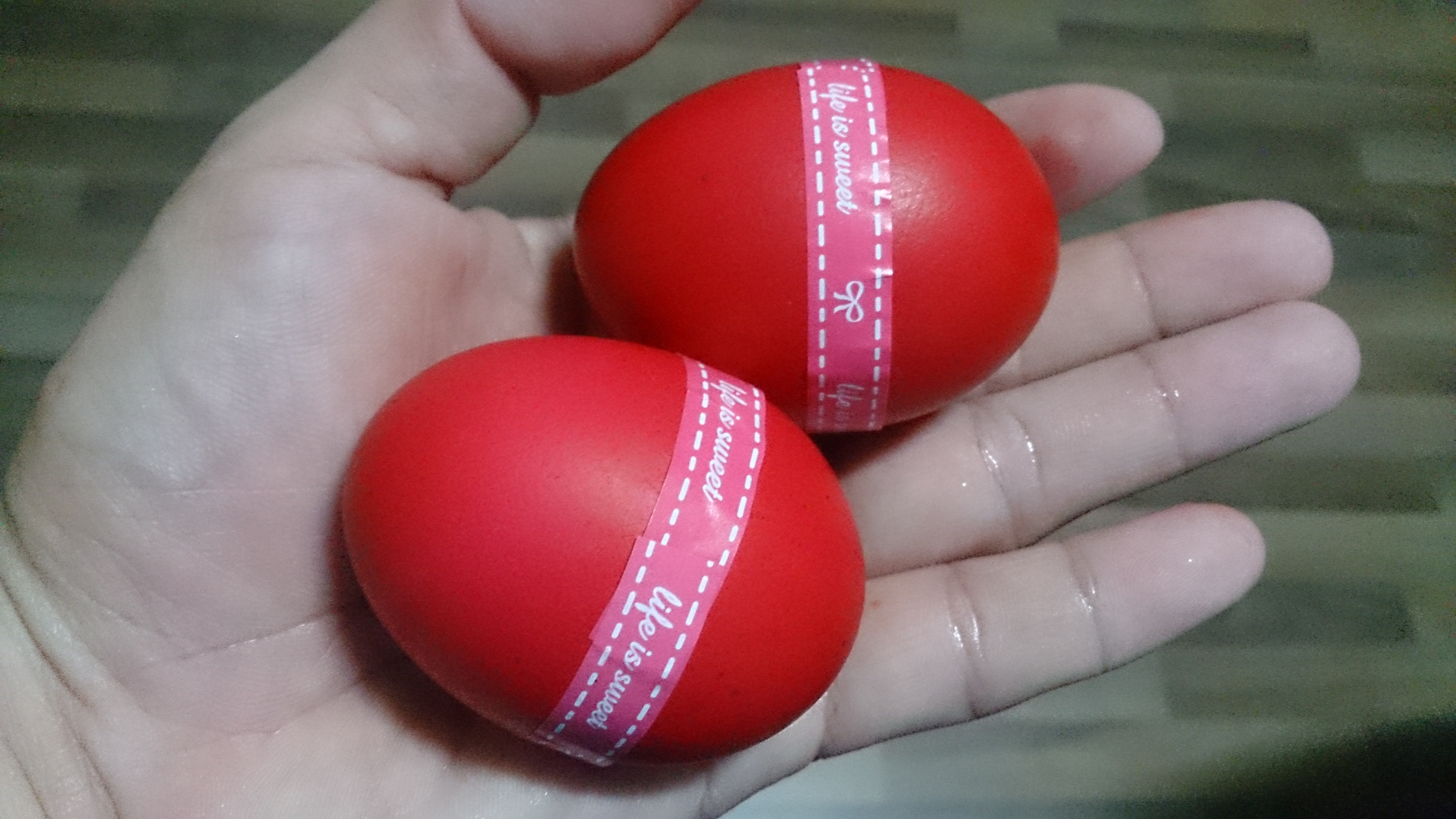
Red-dyed eggs distributed during birthdays and baby celebrations by the Chinese community in Singapore

In Chinese culture, it is common to hold a ginger and red egg party at the baby's first-year birthday where the baby's name is usually announced to friends and family for the first time. One might find a bowl of brightly coloured boiled chicken eggs on the guests' buffet or serving tables, or the hosts hand out the red-dyed eggs, symbolizing joy and renewed life. Sometimes the red eggs are also given to adult friends and family members for their birthdays.

== Origin and folklore ==
Similar to Western Easter eggs, in Chinese culture eggs symbolize birth or a new start; thus, it is of paramount importance for eggs to be served to guests during an important birthday (such as the first month or first year). The color red symbolizes prosperity and good fortune to the Chinese.

== Influence outside China ==
=== Mauritius ===
In Mauritius, Sino-Mauritians continued the tradition of sharing red eggs to their family members to share the joy of a newborn; this tradition occurs in what is now called baptême chinois (lit. Chinese baptism).

== See also ==
- Smoked egg
- Tea egg
