= Mount Livadiyskaya =

Mountain in Russia

Coordinates: 43.067°N 132.683°E

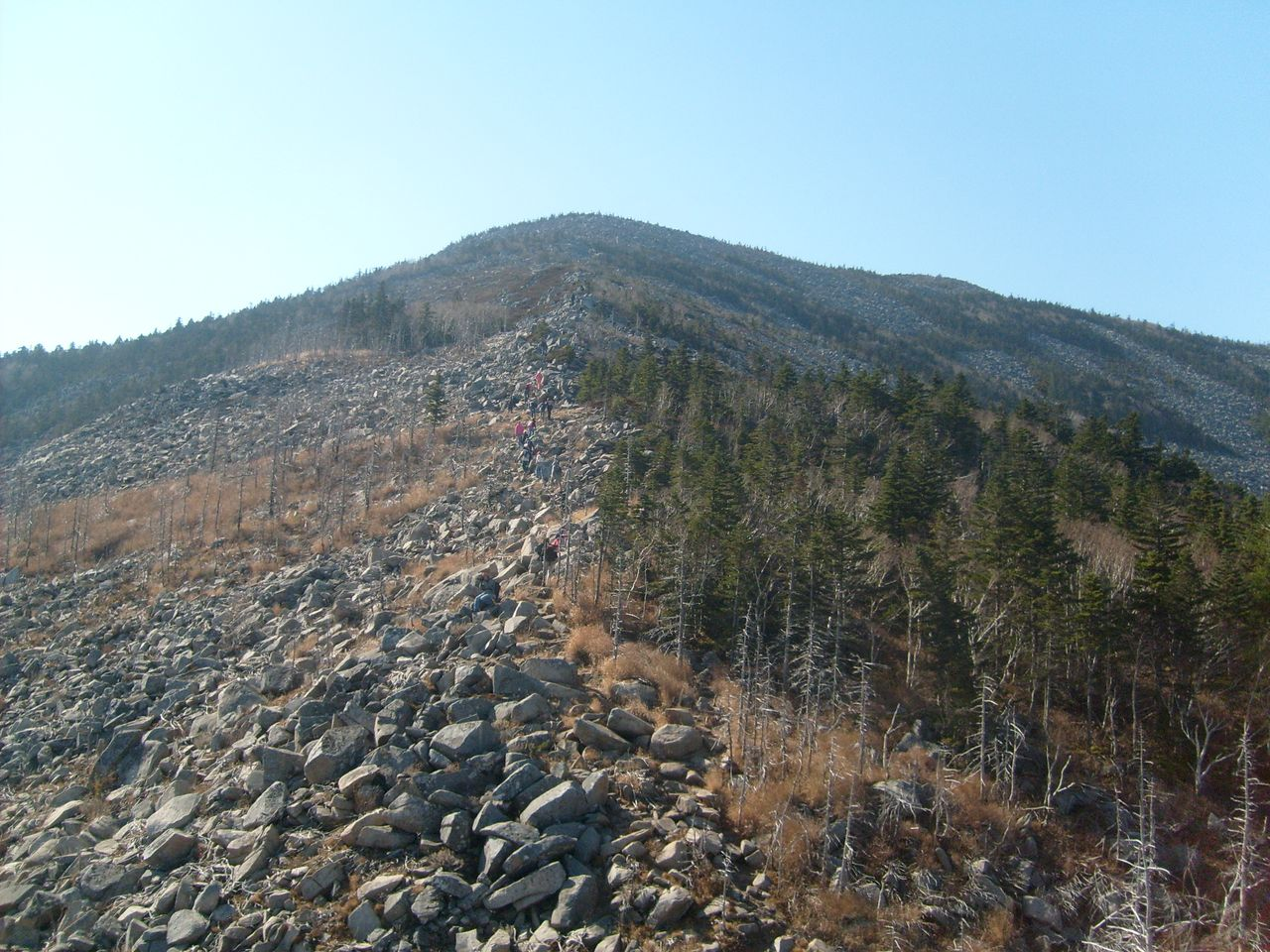

Highest point
- Elevation: 1,332 m (4,370 ft)

Geography
- Location: Primorsky Krai, Russia
- Parent range: Livadiysky Range

Mount Livadiyskaya (Russian: гора́ Ливади́йская or со́пка Ливади́йская), unofficially known as Mount Pedan (Педа́н) or Mount Pidan (Пида́н), is one of the highest peaks in Shkotovsky District of Primorsky Krai, Russia.

Livadiyskaya is part of the Livadiysky Range of the Sikhote-Alin.

The mountain is a popular hiking spot, which has seen a surge in the number of ascensions in recent years. This has resulted in worsening contamination.
