= Smoked egg =

Food that involves the smoking of eggs

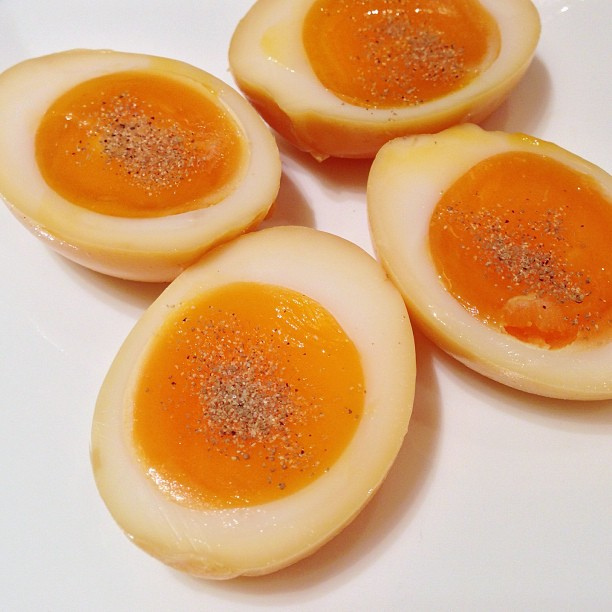
- Main ingredients: Eggs

Smoked egg is a food that involves the smoking of bird eggs and fish eggs. Smoked eggs can be prepared with boiled eggs that are then smoked, or by smoking uncooked eggs in their shells. Additionally, smoked egg has been defined as a type of hors d'oeuvre of boiled eggs that are shelled, marinated, and then smoked.

== Smoked caviar ==
Some caviars that are sometimes smoked include cod roe, which is common in Norway, mullet roe, and sturgeon roe. Another product is smoked-egg liqueur, which can be derived from raw, frozen salmon roe.

== Dishes ==
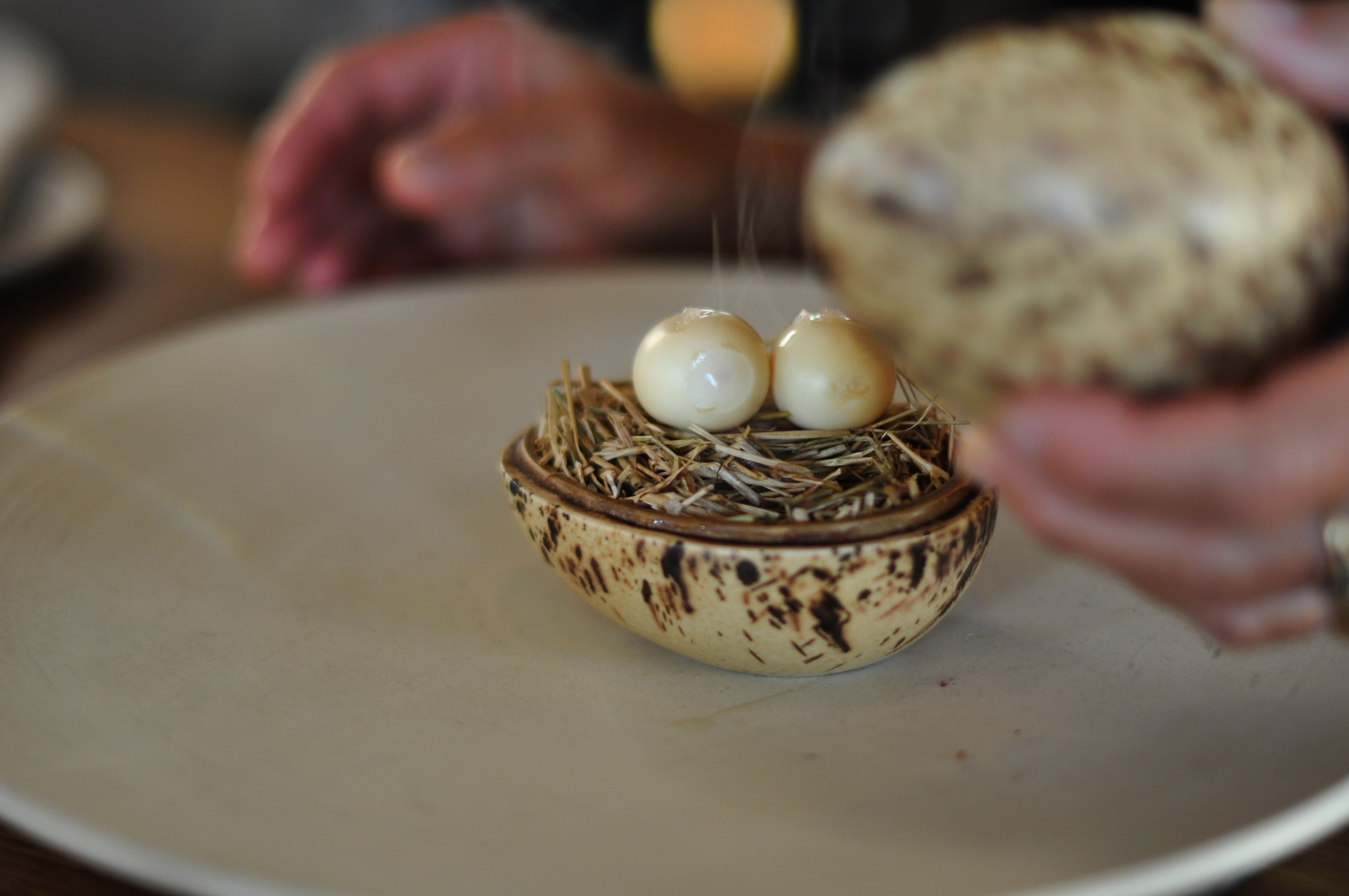
Pickled and smoked quail eggs in New Danish style at Noma

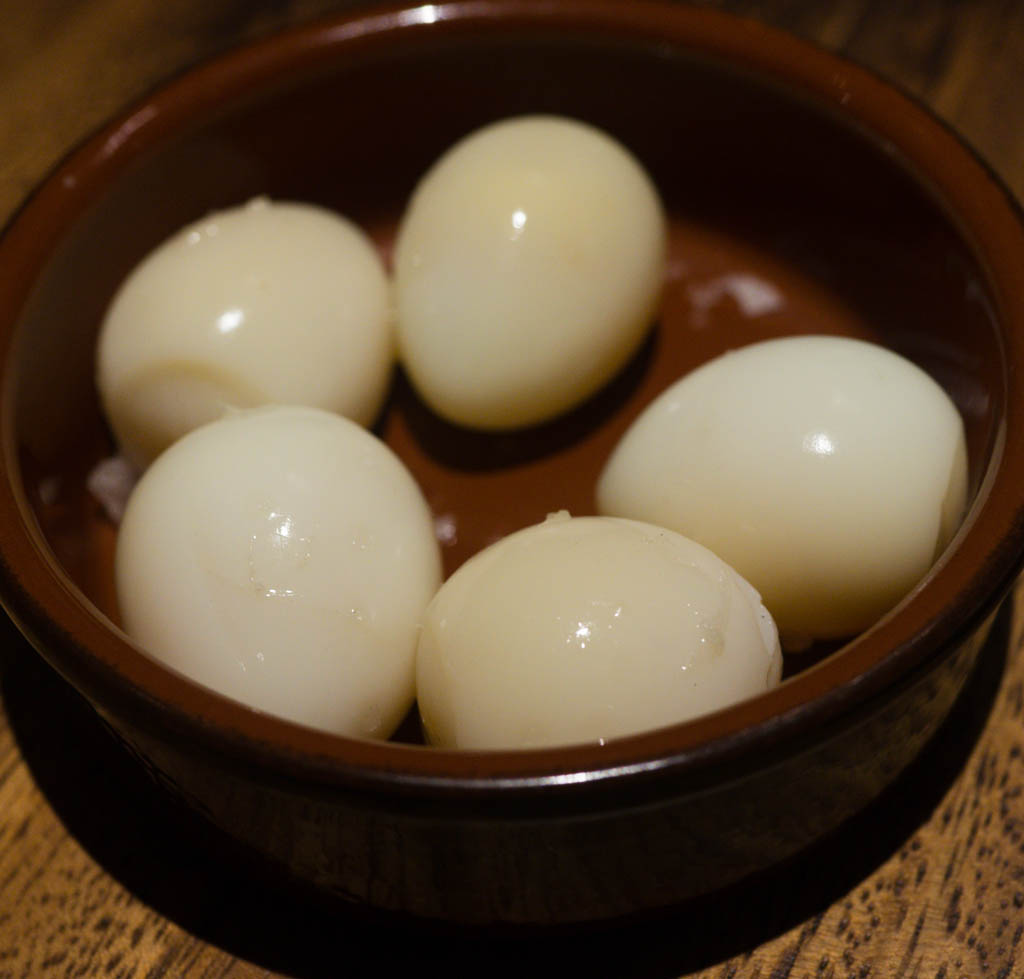
A close-up view of smoked quail eggs

Smoked eggs can be made into smoked egg pâté. Additional dishes and foods prepared from smoked eggs are egg salad, vinaigrette dressing and dips One version of niçoise salad uses a smoked egg foam as an ingredient. Purées prepared with smoked egg have been used to enhance the flavor of various dishes.

== See also ==
- List of egg dishes
- List of hors d'oeuvre
- List of smoked foods
