= List of breakfast foods =

This is a list of notable breakfast foods from A to Z. Breakfast is the meal taken after rising from a night's sleep, most often eaten in the early morning before undertaking a day's work. Among English speakers, breakfast can be used to refer to this meal or to refer to a meal composed of traditional breakfast foods such as eggs and much more. Breakfast foods are prepared with a multitude of ingredients, including oats, wheat, maize, barley, noodles, starches, eggs, and meats (such as hot Italian sausage).

== Breakfast foods ==
=== A ===
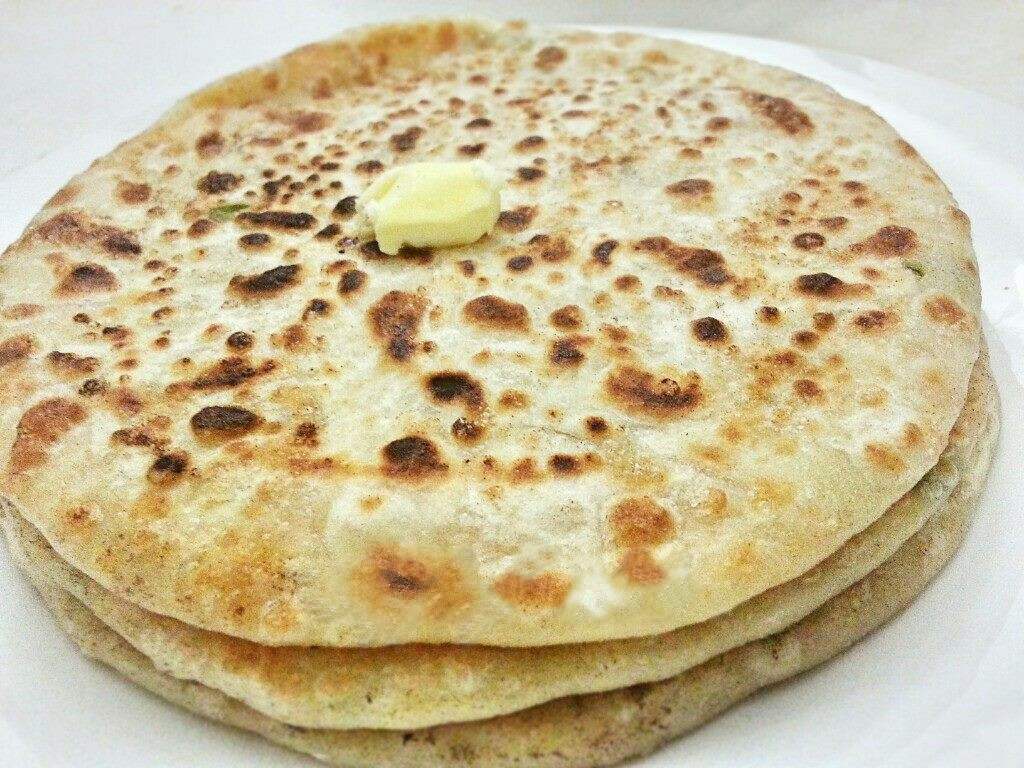
Aloo paratha-served as a breakfast dish in India and Pakistan

- Ackee and saltfish – national dish of Jamaica
- Aloo paratha – Flatbread from South Asia
- Anadama bread – Yeast bread of United States origin
- Apple dumpling – Pastry-wrapped apple
- Arepa – South American corn flatbread

=== B ===
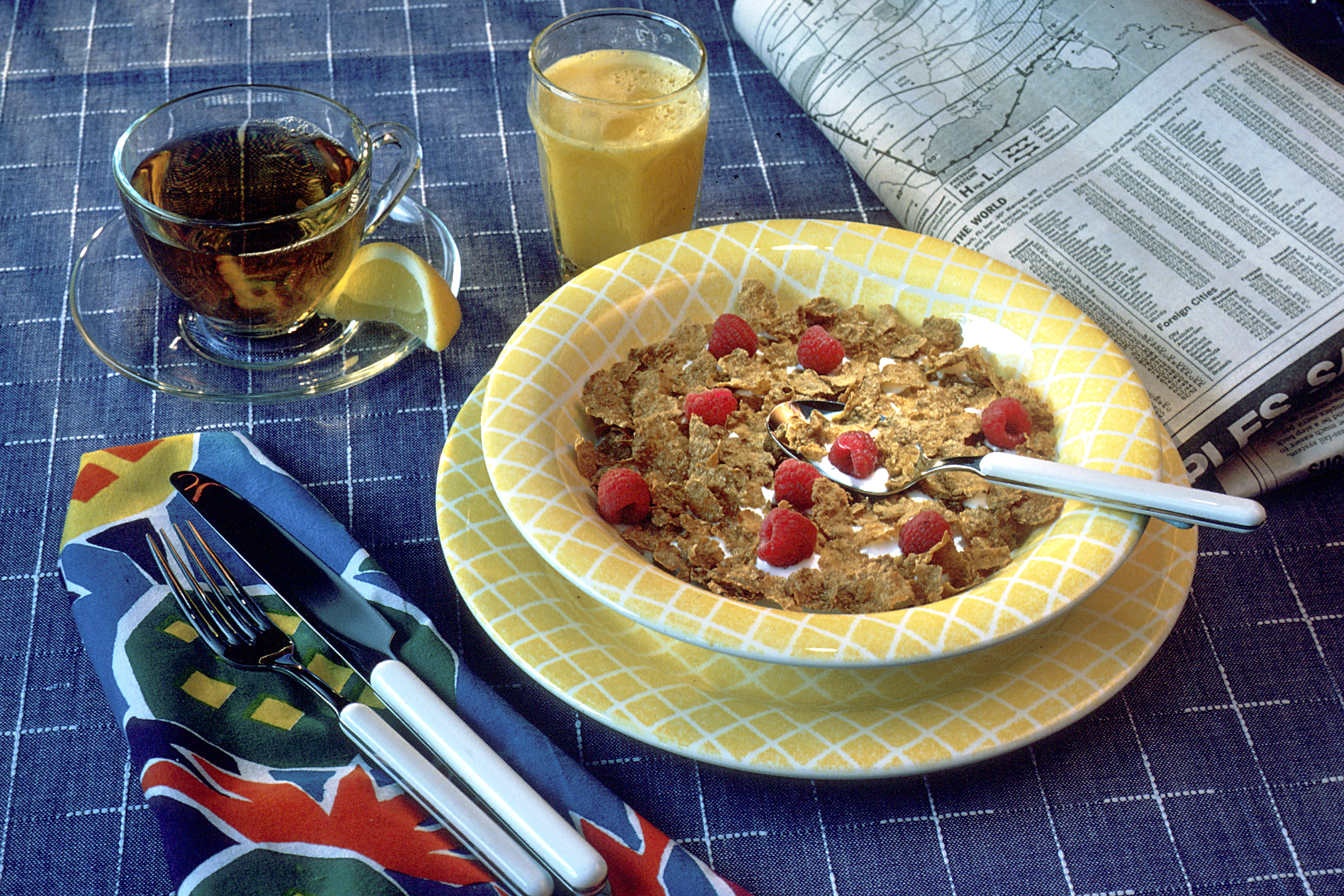
Breakfast cereal with milk and raspberries

- Bacon – Type of salt-cured pork
- Bacon, egg and cheese sandwich – Breakfast sandwich
- Bacon and eggs – Breakfast served in Great Britain and Ireland
- Bacon sandwich – Sandwich of cooked bacon
- Bagel – Ring-shaped bread product
- Bagel and cream cheese – Common food pairing in American cuisine
- Baked beans – Cooked beans in a seasoned sauce
- Banana – in Jamaican cuisine, boiled green bananas are served as a breakfast side dish.
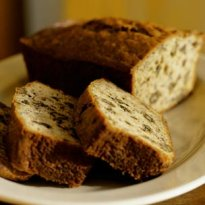
- Banana nut bread
  Banana bread
- Bánh mì - Vietnamese baguette sandwich
- Barley honey – a Japanese product prepared with barley starch, typically combined with rice flour
- Bear claw – Pastry with almond paste filling
- Bhakri – Flatbread of western and central India
- Bhature – fluffy deep-fried leavened bread from northern India
- Bialy – Yeasted bread roll
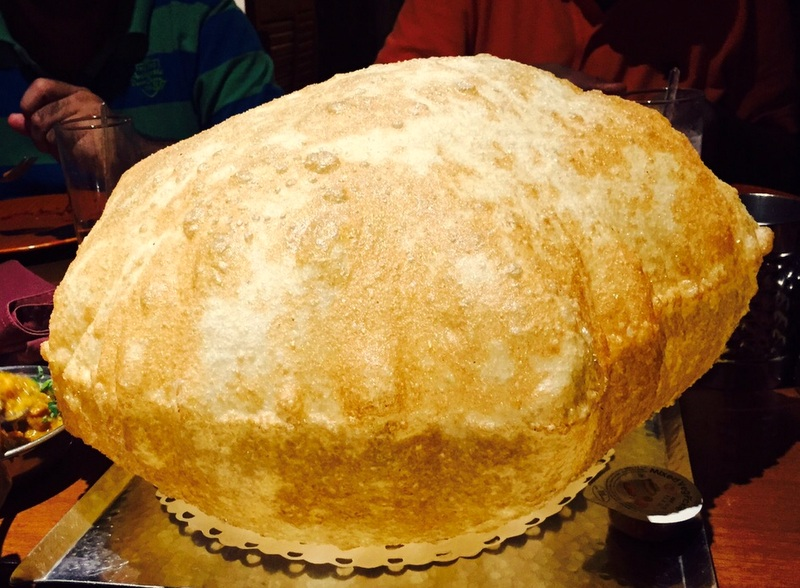
  Bhatoora-fluffy deep-fried leavened bread from Northern India
  Biscuits and gravy
- Bizcocho – Pastry
- Boiled egg – Egg dish
- Boudin – Types of sausage
- Bran flakes – Breakfast cereal
- Bread – Food made of flour and water
- Breadfruit – Edible fruit-bearing tree
- Breakfast burrito – Breakfast entree
- Breakfast cereal – Processed food made from grain
- Breakfast pizza – pizza with toppings commonly eaten for breakfast
- Breakfast roll – Bread roll with elements of a traditional fried breakfast
- Breakfast sandwich – Sandwich with breakfast foods
- Breakfast sausage – Pork sausage usually served at breakfast in the United States
- Breakfast taco – Mexican filled tortilla dish
- Brown bread – Whole grain bread
- Brunch Bar – British multinational confectionery company

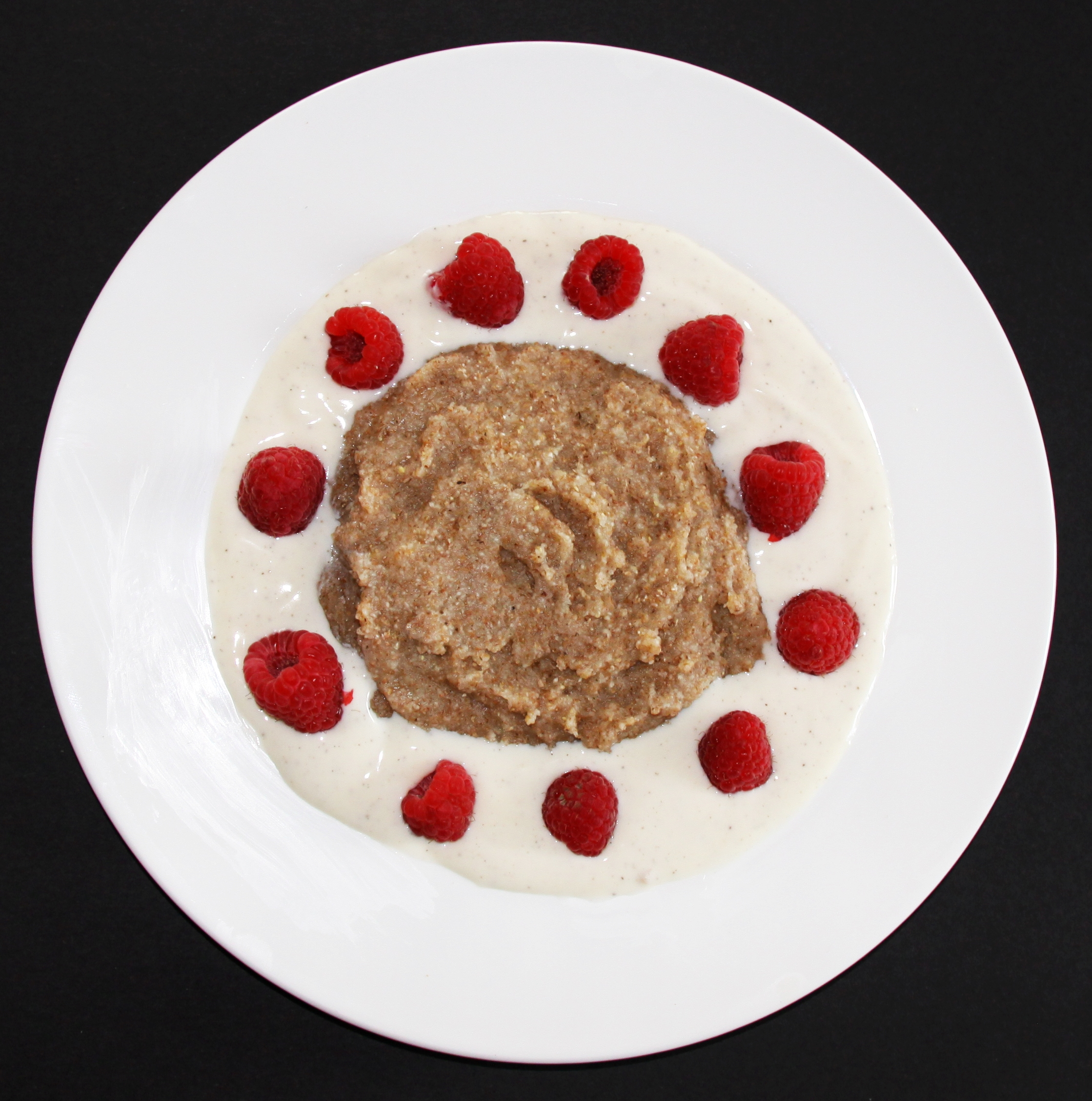
Brenntar with vanilla sauce

- Bubur kacang hijau – a common porridge and typical breakfast dish in Indonesia, made from mung beans, coconut milk and sugar.

=== C ===
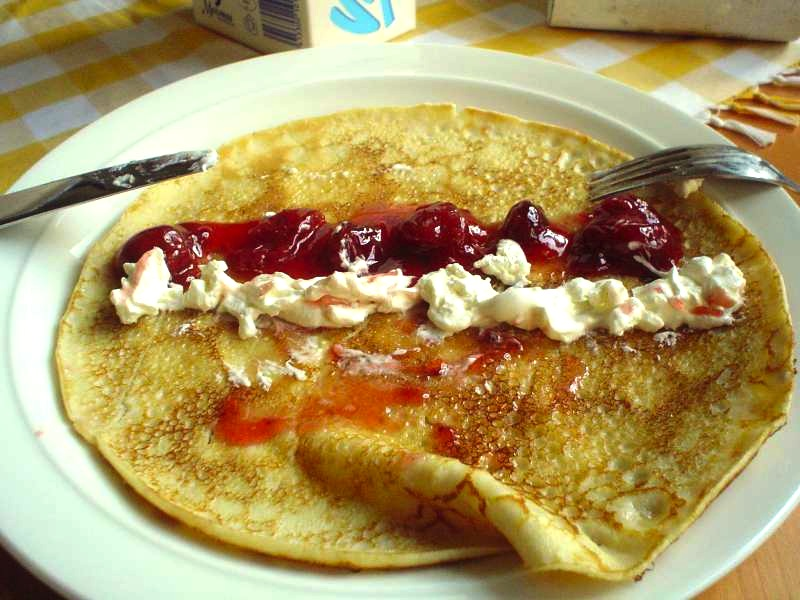
An unrolled crêpe with whipped cream and strawberry sauce

- Calas – a breakfast food in New Orleans
- Cereal – Processed food made from grain
- Cereal bar – Oat bar made with butter, sugar & syrup
- Cereal germ – Reproductive part of a grass seed
- Changua – Traditional Colombian late night dish
- Chicken and waffles – American dish
- Chilaquiles – Traditional Mexican dish
- Chipped beef on toast – Sliced dried beef product
- Chocolate gravy – Gravy made with cocoa powder
- Chouriço – Pork sausage originating from the Iberian Peninsula
- Chwee kueh – Chinese steamed rice cake
- Cinnamon roll – Sweet roll flavoured with cinnamon

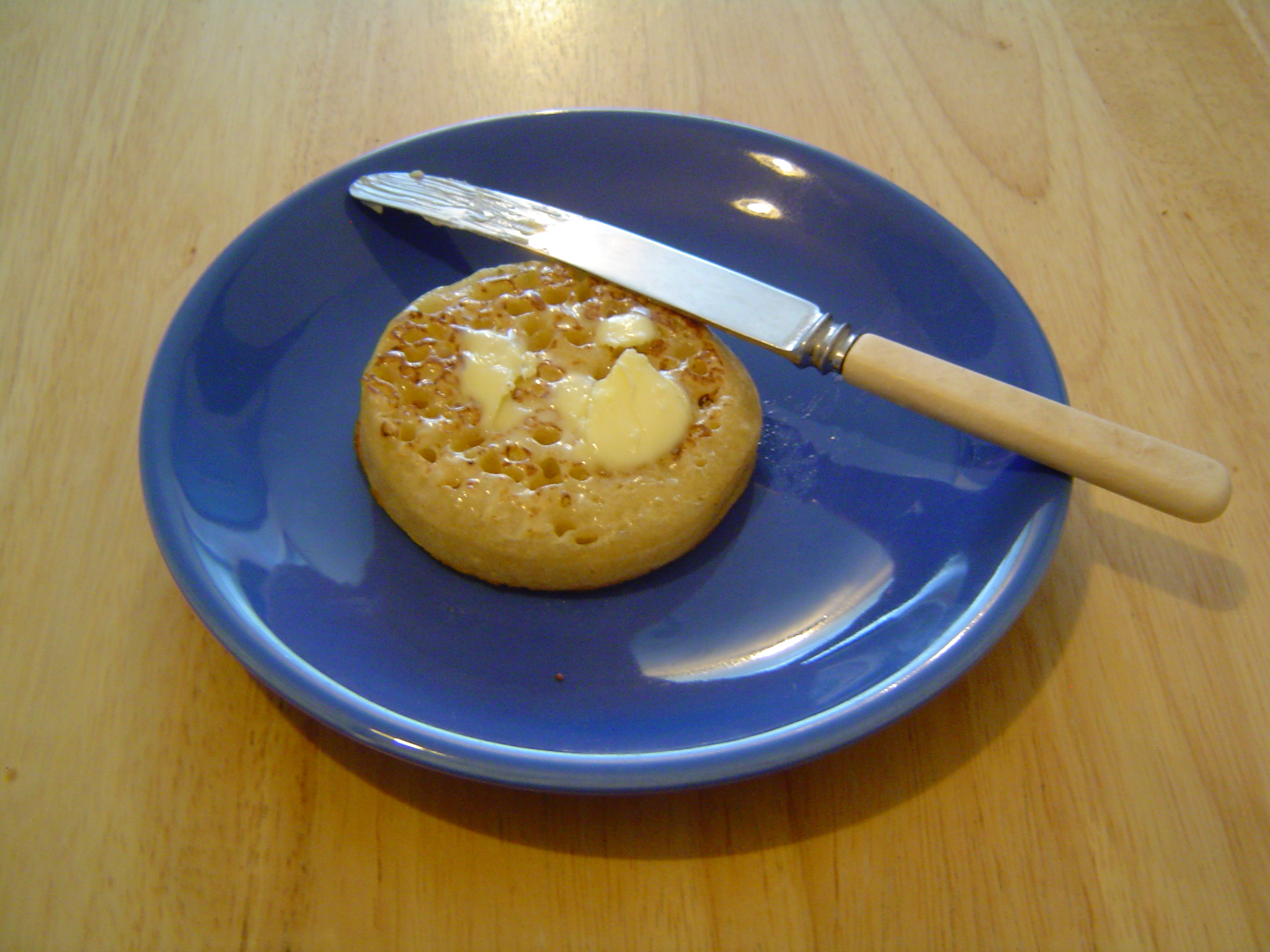
Buttered crumpet

- Coffee cake

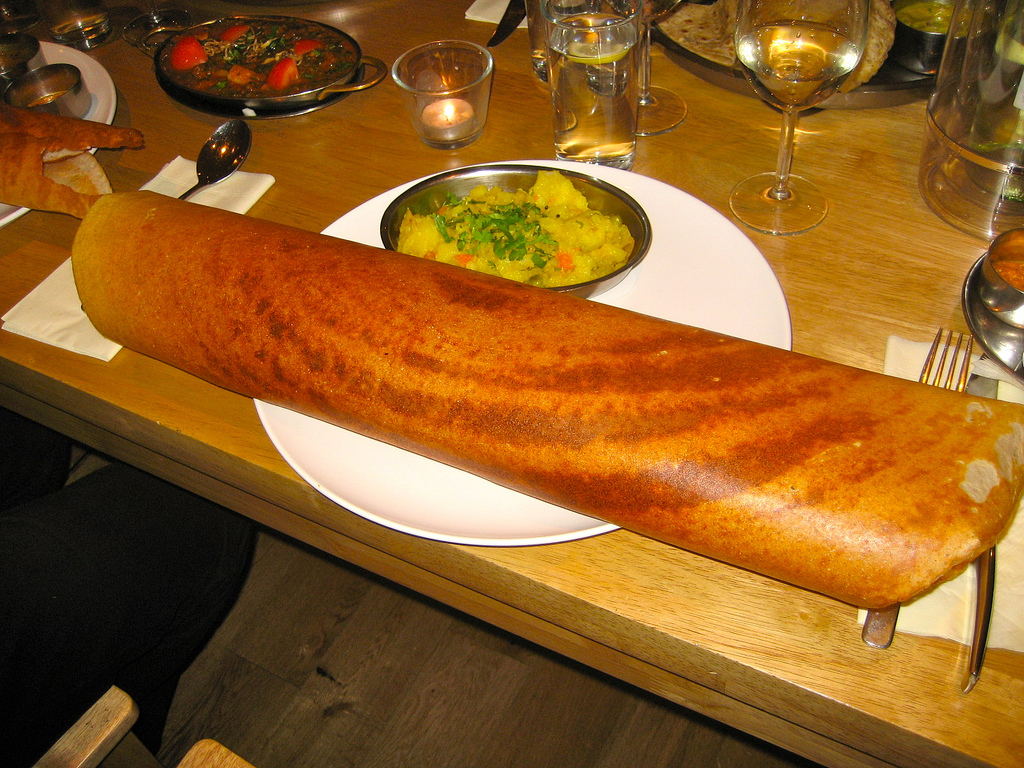
Dosa – served as a breakfast dish in India

- Collops – Meat dish
- Conecuh sausage, waffle-wrapped sausage on a stick invented in Alabama
- Congee – Asian savoury rice porridge dish
- Cottage cheese
- Creamed eggs on toast
- Crêpe
- Cretons
- Croissant
- Crumpet
- Cuban bread

=== D ===
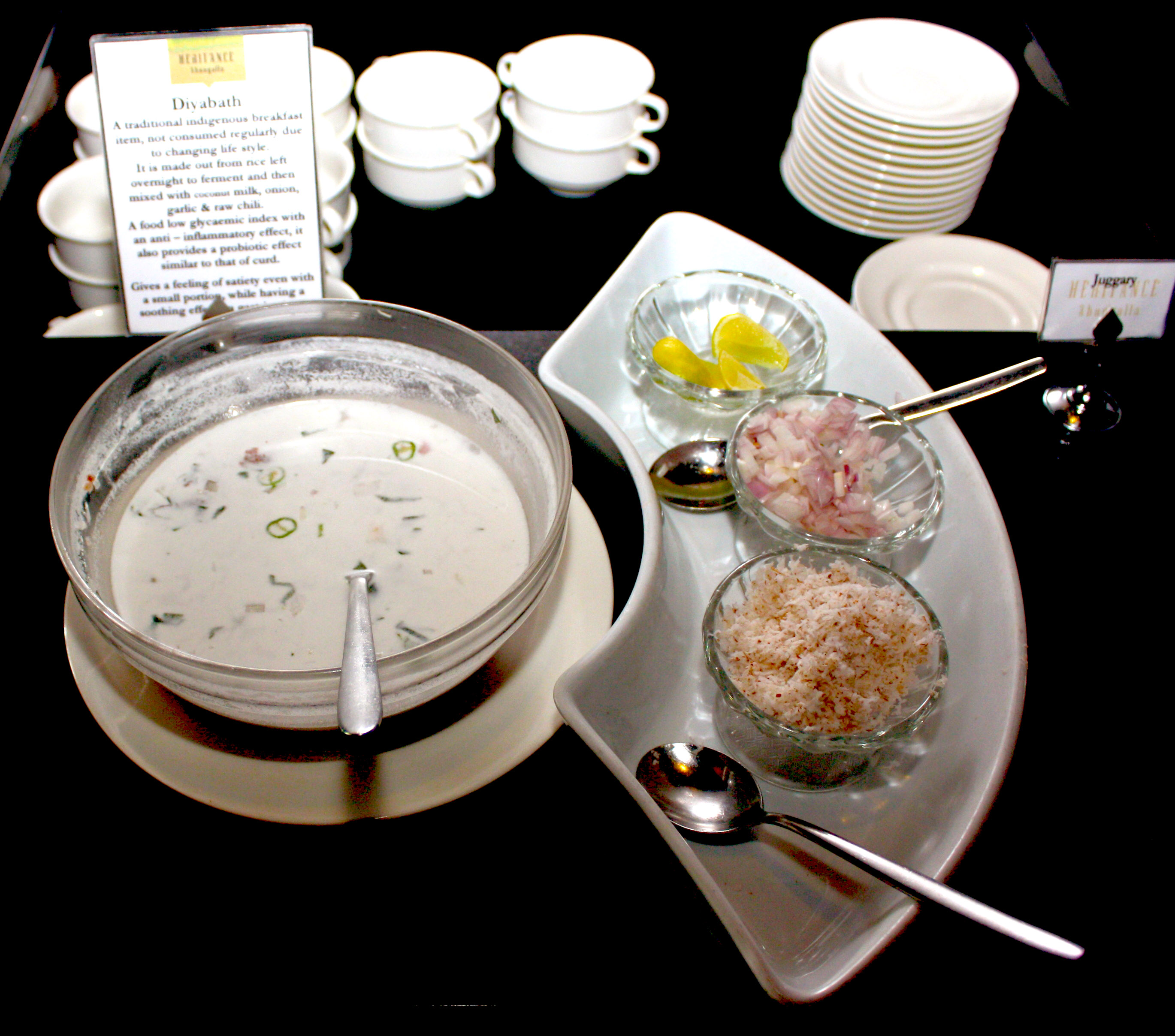
Diyabath (left), a traditional Sri Lankan indigenous breakfast item

- Danbing – Taiwanese egg crêpe
- David Eyre's pancake – Pancake originating from the United States
- Deviled egg – Egg-based dish
- Devilled kidneys – Dish based on kidneys
- Dim sum – Chinese cuisine
- Dosa – Thin batter bread originating from South India
- Doughnut or Donut – Sweet food made from deep-fried dough
- Doubles – Indo-Caribbean street food originating in Trinidad and Tobago
- Dutch baby pancake – Pancake originating from the United States

=== E ===
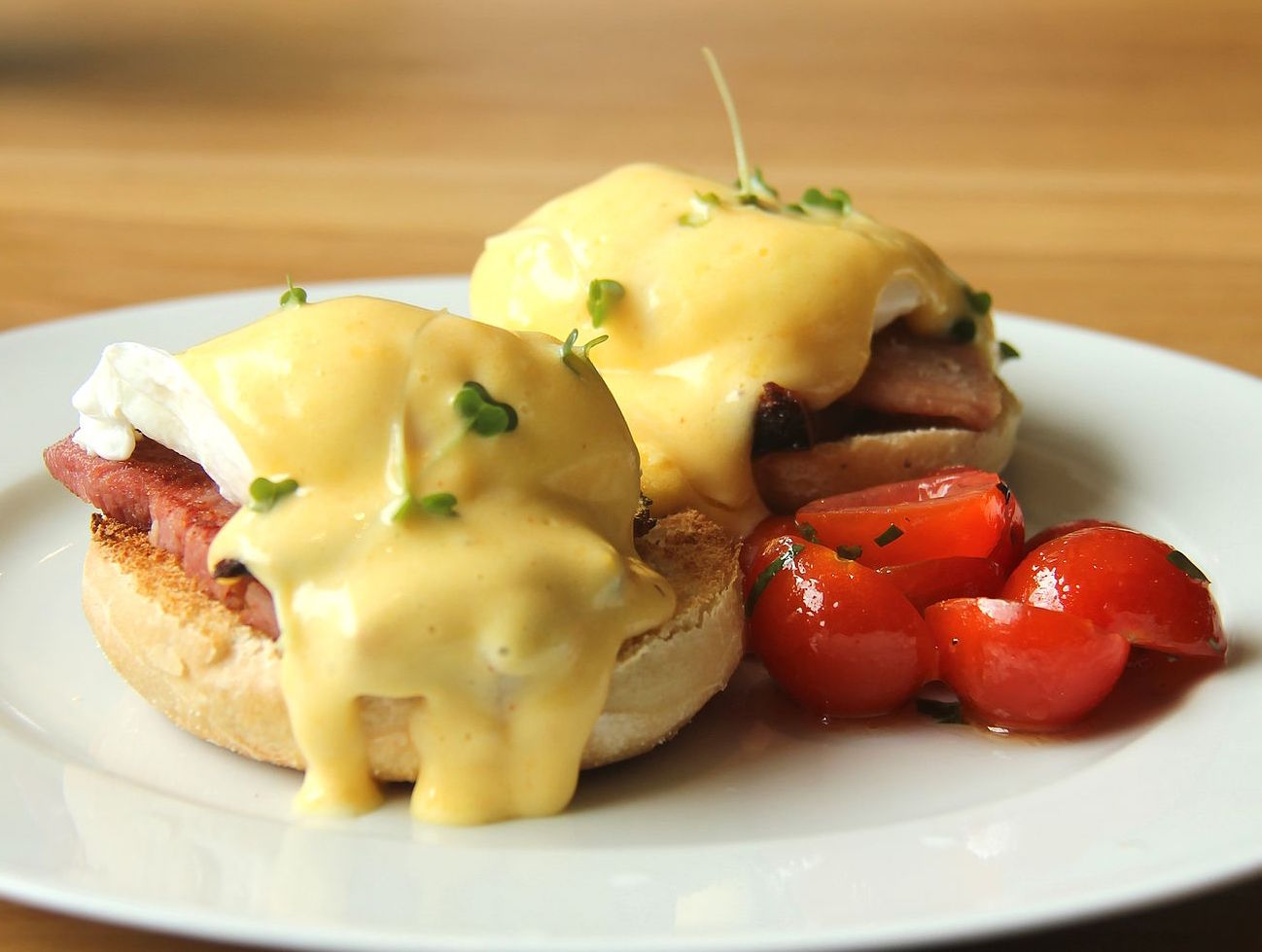
Eggs Benedict

- Egg – Edible animal product
- Egg in the basket – Egg fried in a hole in a slice of bread
- Egg muffins - Eggs and vegetables or meat baked in a muffin tin
- Egg sandwich – Sandwich with some kind of egg filling
- Eggs and brains – Portuguese breakfast dish
- Eggs Beauregard – American egg dish
- Eggs Benedict – American breakfast or brunch dish
- Egg bhurji – Scrambled eggs dish
- Eggs bourguignon (Oeufs en meurette) – French egg dish
- Eggo cereal – Breakfast cereal made by WK Kellogg Co
- Eggs Neptune – American breakfast or brunch dish
- Eggs Sardou – Louisiana Creole dish
- Enchilada – Corn tortilla rolled around a filling and covered with a sauce
- Energy bar – Cereal snack bar
- English muffin – Small, round, flat yeast-leavened bread

=== F ===
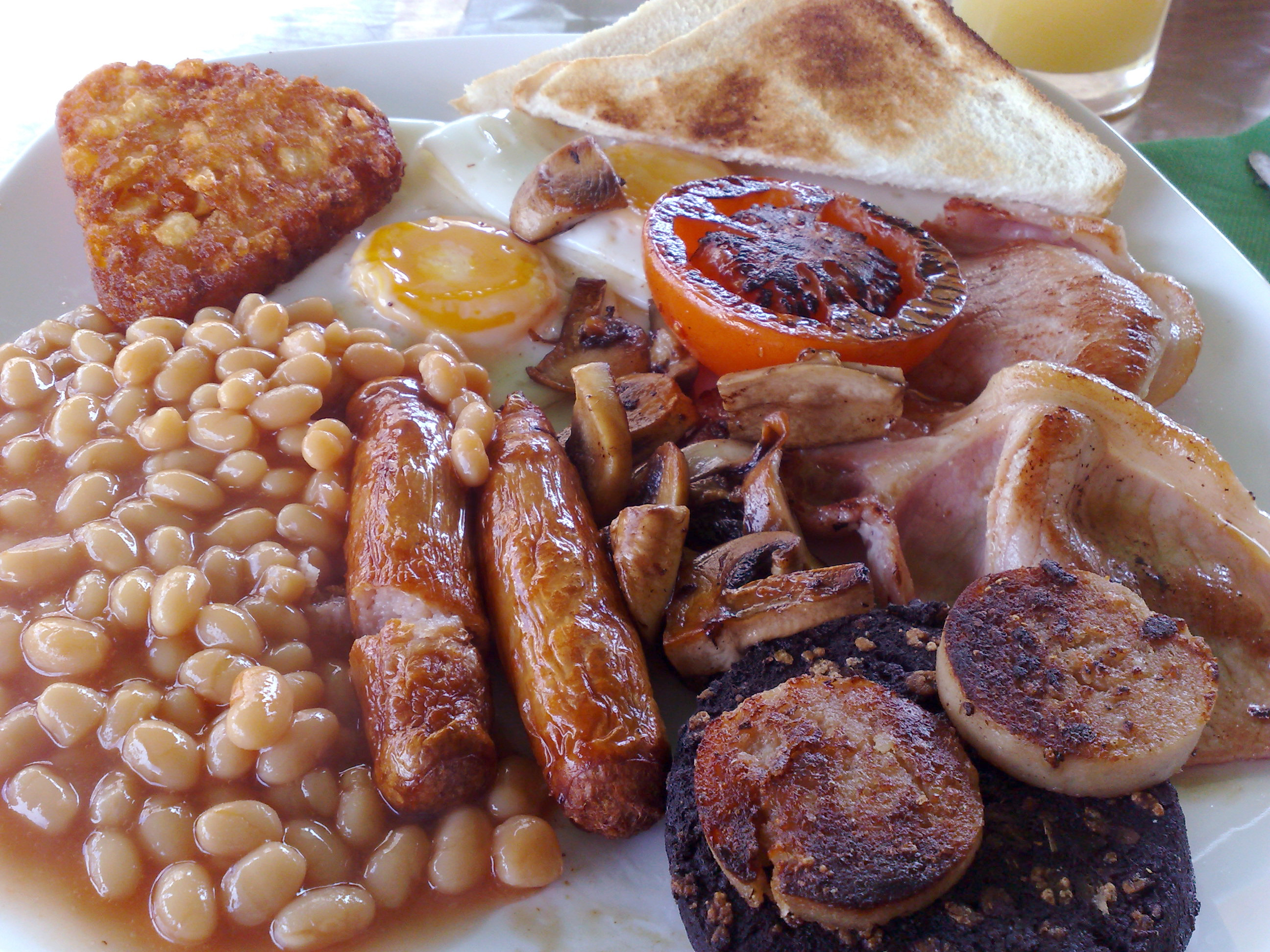
A full English breakfast with fried egg, sausage, white and black pudding, bacon, mushrooms, baked beans, hash browns, toast, and tomato

- Facturas – Multilayered, laminated sweet pastry
- Fatoot samneh – Israeli fried pita and egg dish
- Foul – An Egyptian and Middle Eastern dish made with cooked fava beans flavored with lemon juice, garlic and served with olive oil, chopped parsley & tomatoes.
- French toast – Dish of fried bread and eggs
- Fried bread – Slice of bread that has been fried
- Fried cheese – served as a breakfast dish in Cyprus, Greece, Lebanon, Syria and Turkey
- Fried chicken – Consumed as a breakfast food by some in Perth, Western Australia

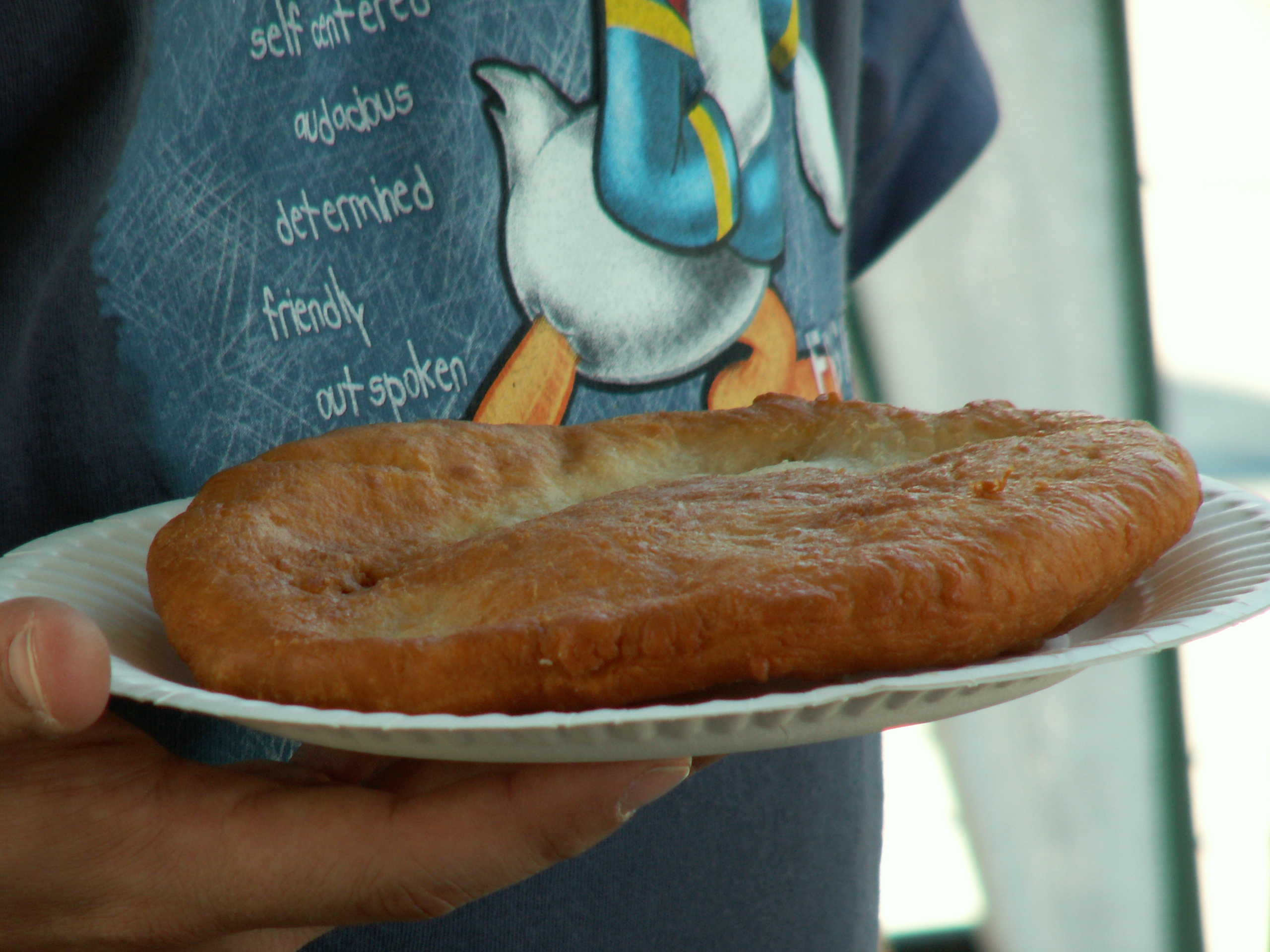
Frybread

- Fried egg – Cooked dish made from one or more eggs
- Frittata – Egg-based Italian dish
- Frühschoppen – German and Austrian drinking tradition
- Fruit pudding – Scottish dish in the form of large sausage
- Fruit salad – Dish consisting of fruits
- Falafal – Middle Eastern fried bean dish
- Full breakfast – Breakfast served in Great Britain and Ireland

=== G ===
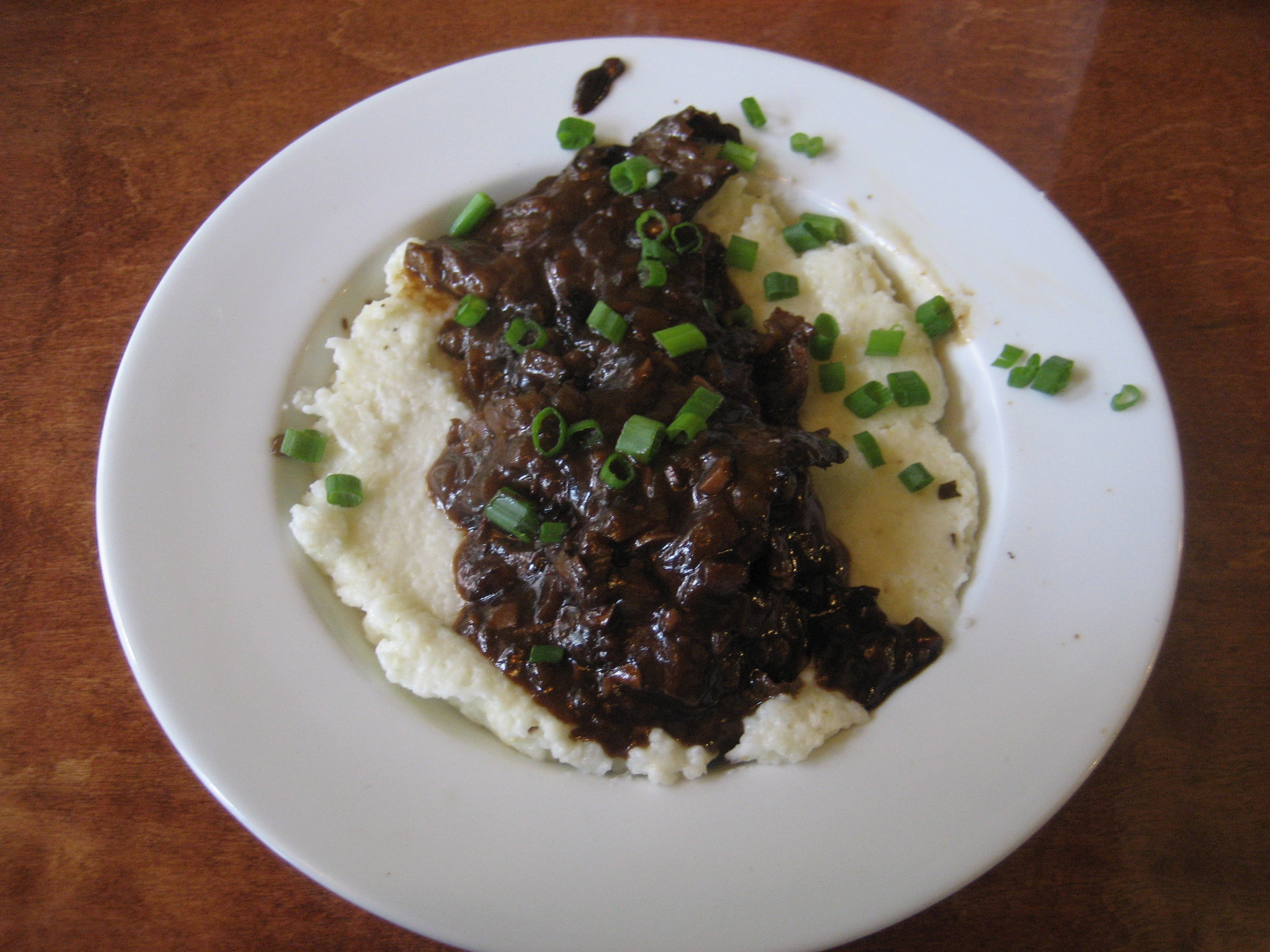
Grillades and grits topped with scallions at a restaurant in New Orleans

- Gnocchi – Small pasta-like dough dumplings
- Goetta – US pork and oats dish
- Gogli – Egg-based homemade dessert
- Granola – Breakfast, lunch and snack food
- Griddle scone – Baked goods
- Grillades – Louisiana Creole meat dish
- Grits – Porridge of boiled cornmeal

=== H ===
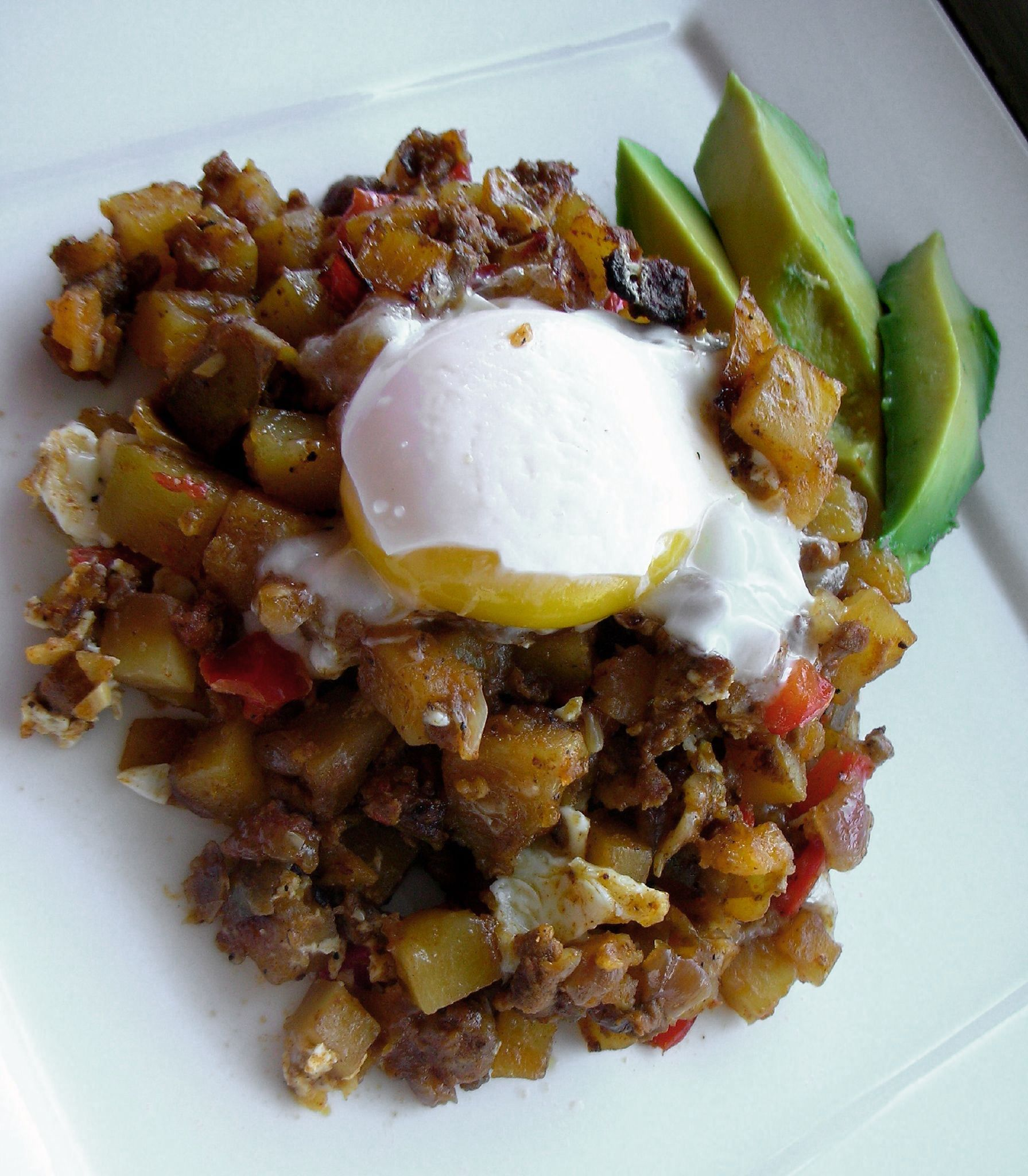
Hash with a coddled egg atop it

- Halwa poori
- Ham
- Ham and eggs – has been described as a staple of "an old-fashioned American breakfast" and of the traditional English breakfast
- Hamburger
- Hangtown Fry
- Hash
- Hash browns
- Home fries
- Huevos divorciados – a Mexican breakfast dish that consists of two fried eggs, chilaquiles and salsa. Typically, one egg is covered in salsa roja, while the other is covered in salsa verde, giving them distinct and complementary flavors.
- Huevos motuleños
- Huevos pericos
- Huevos rancheros

=== I ===
- Idli – consumed as a breakfast food in Southern India
- Instant breakfast
- Irish soda bread

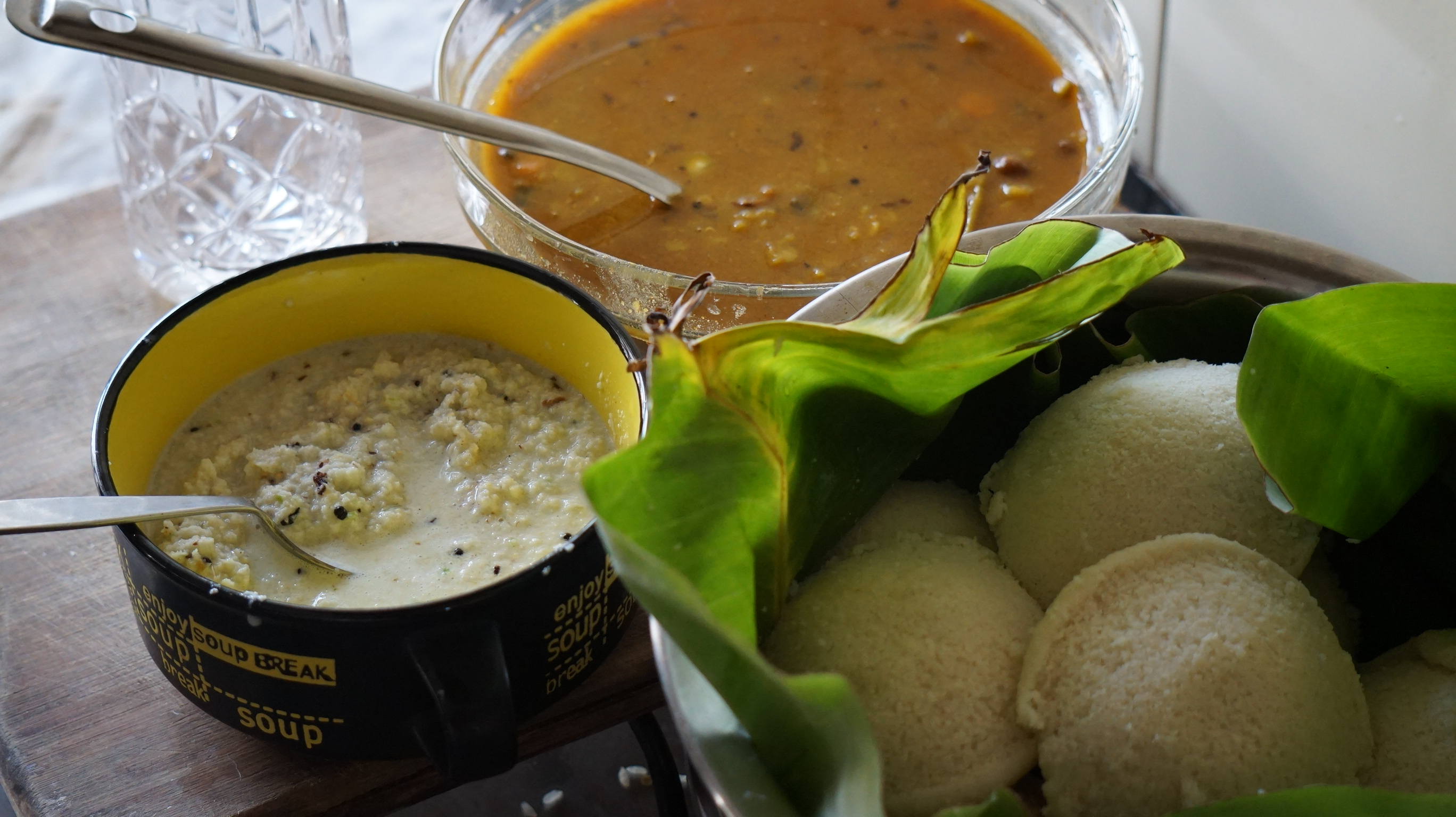
Idli with sambar and coconut chutney

=== J ===
- Jianbing guozi – Chinese stuffed pancake
- Johnnycake – American cornmeal flatbread

=== K ===
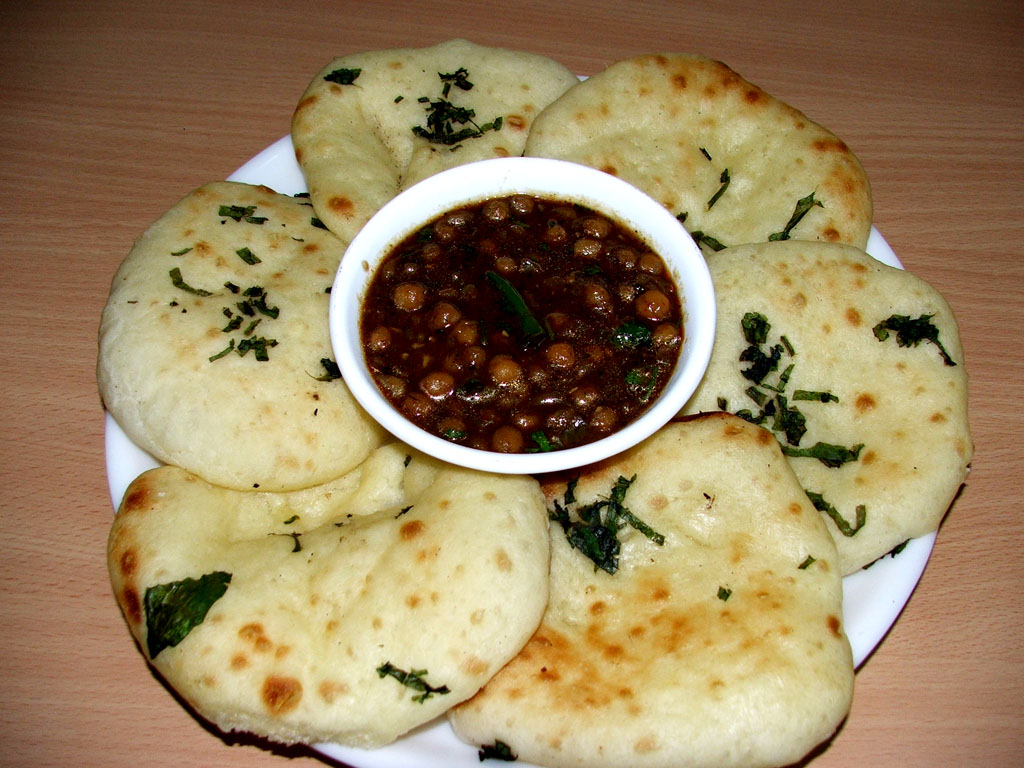
Kulcha with chole (chickpeas, in center), from India

- Kahi – Iraqi sweet breakfast dish
- Katogo – Ugandan breakfast dish
- Kedgeree – Fish and rice-based dish
- Khaman – Snack in Gujarat, India
- Kippers – Whole cold-smoked herrings
- Kiribath – Coconut milk rice dish
- Kix (cereal) – Breakfast cereal made by General Mills
- Kokosbrood
- Kolache – Small, usually sweet, type of sweet bread
- Kringle – Type of pretzel
- Kulcha – a breakfast staple in Pakistan
- Kulich (bread) – Type of Russian Easter bread

=== L ===
- Leben – Food or beverage of fermented milk
- Lefse – Traditional Norwegian flatbread
- Linguiça – Type of Portuguese smoke-cured pork sausage
- Livermush – US pork and cornmeal dish
- Loco moco – Dish in Hawaiian cuisine
- Lox – a fillet of brined salmon

=== M ===
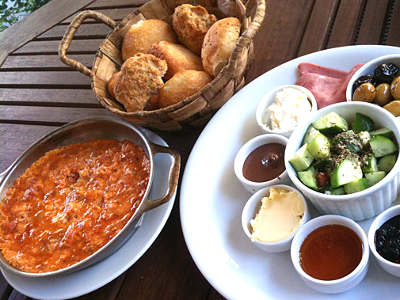
A Turkish breakfast, with menemen (left)

- Malasadas
- Manakish – Levantine dish similar to pizza and often eaten at breakfast.
- Mandoca – usually served at breakfast in Venezuela
- Maple syrup
- Mas huni – a breakfast dish in the Maldives.
- Matzah brei – an Ashkenazi Passover breakfast
- Maypo
- McGriddles
- McMuffin
- Meeshay
- Menemen - Turkish dish consisting of eggs and vegetables
- Mie goreng - Indonesian stir fried noodles
- Migas
- Milk toast
- Milo - Powdered chocolate milk
- Misal pav - a breakfast dish in Maharashtra
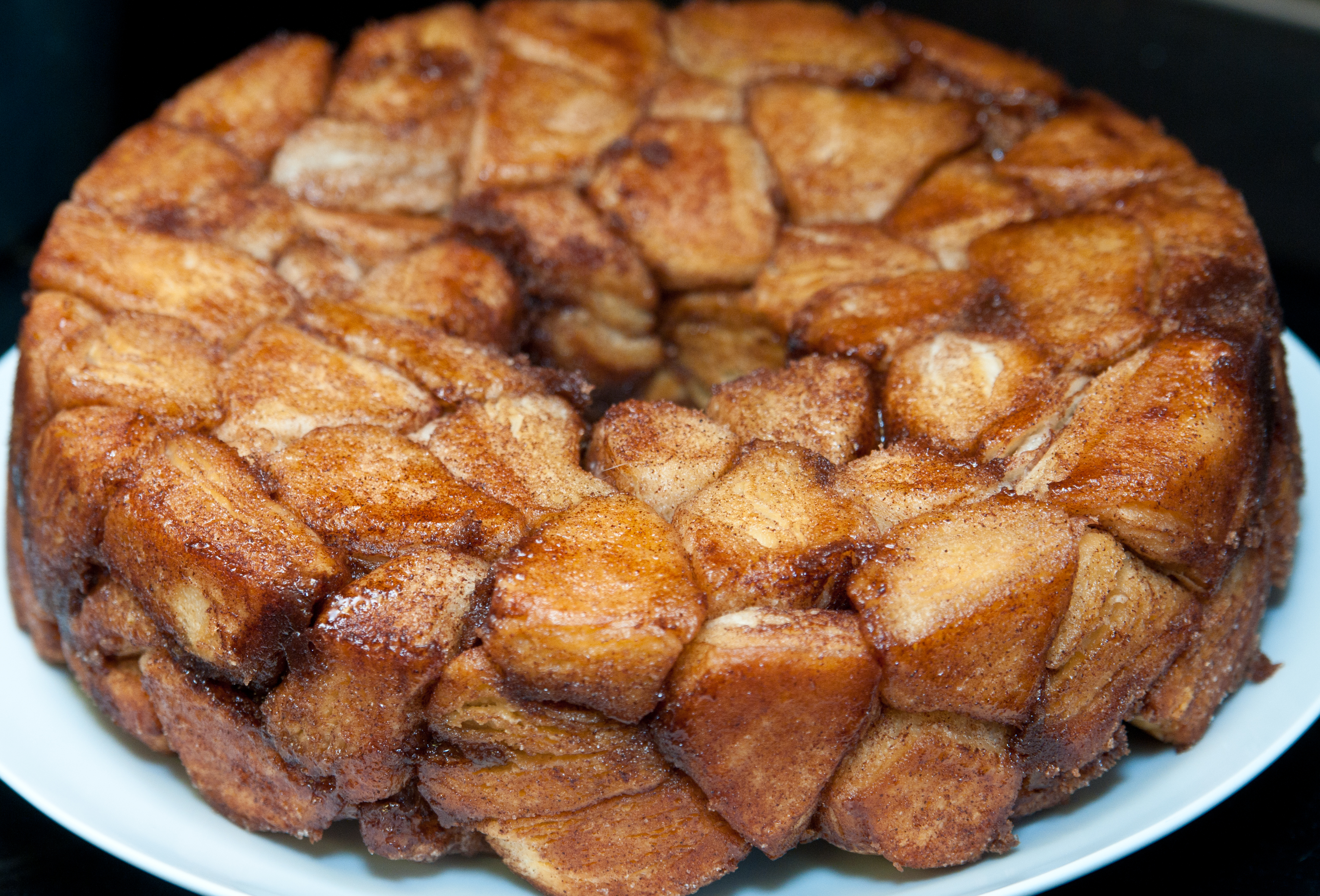
- Monkey bread
  Mohinga – a breakfast food in Burma
- Monkey bread
- Msemen – a common breakfast dish in Morocco (Note: "a square pancake often served for breakfast")
- Muesli
- Muffin
- Mugoyo

=== N ===
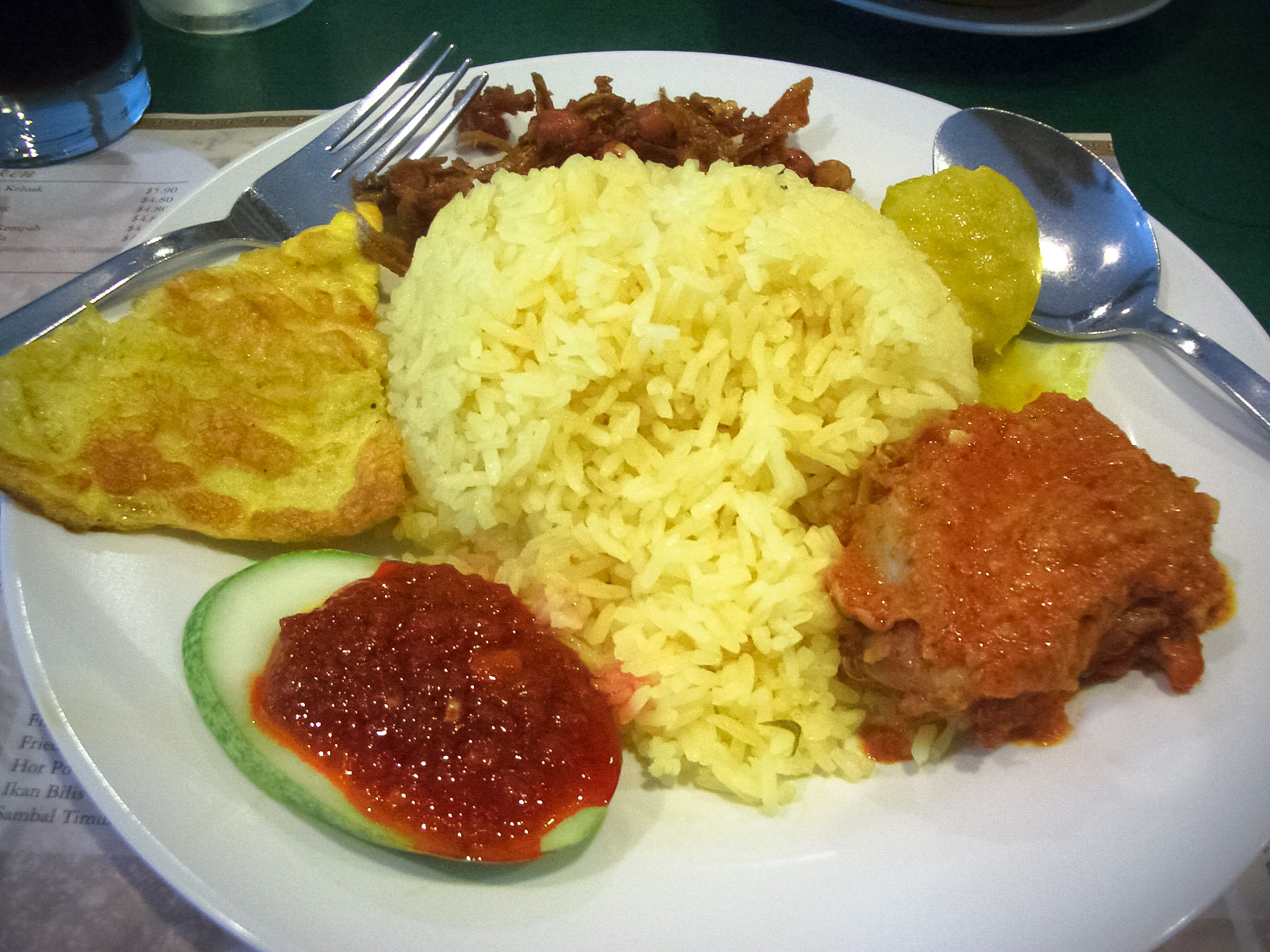
Nasi lemak (center), with fish cake, ikan bilis, egg, and buah keluak chicken

- Nasi goreng – a breakfast dish in Indonesia, Malaysia and Singapore
- Nasi lemak – a breakfast dish in Malaysia and Singapore
- Nattō – a Japanese breakfast dish

=== O ===
- Oatmeal
- Omelette
- Omurice
- Ontbijtkoek
- Orange juice
- Ox-tongue pastry
- Oysters Rockefeller

=== P ===
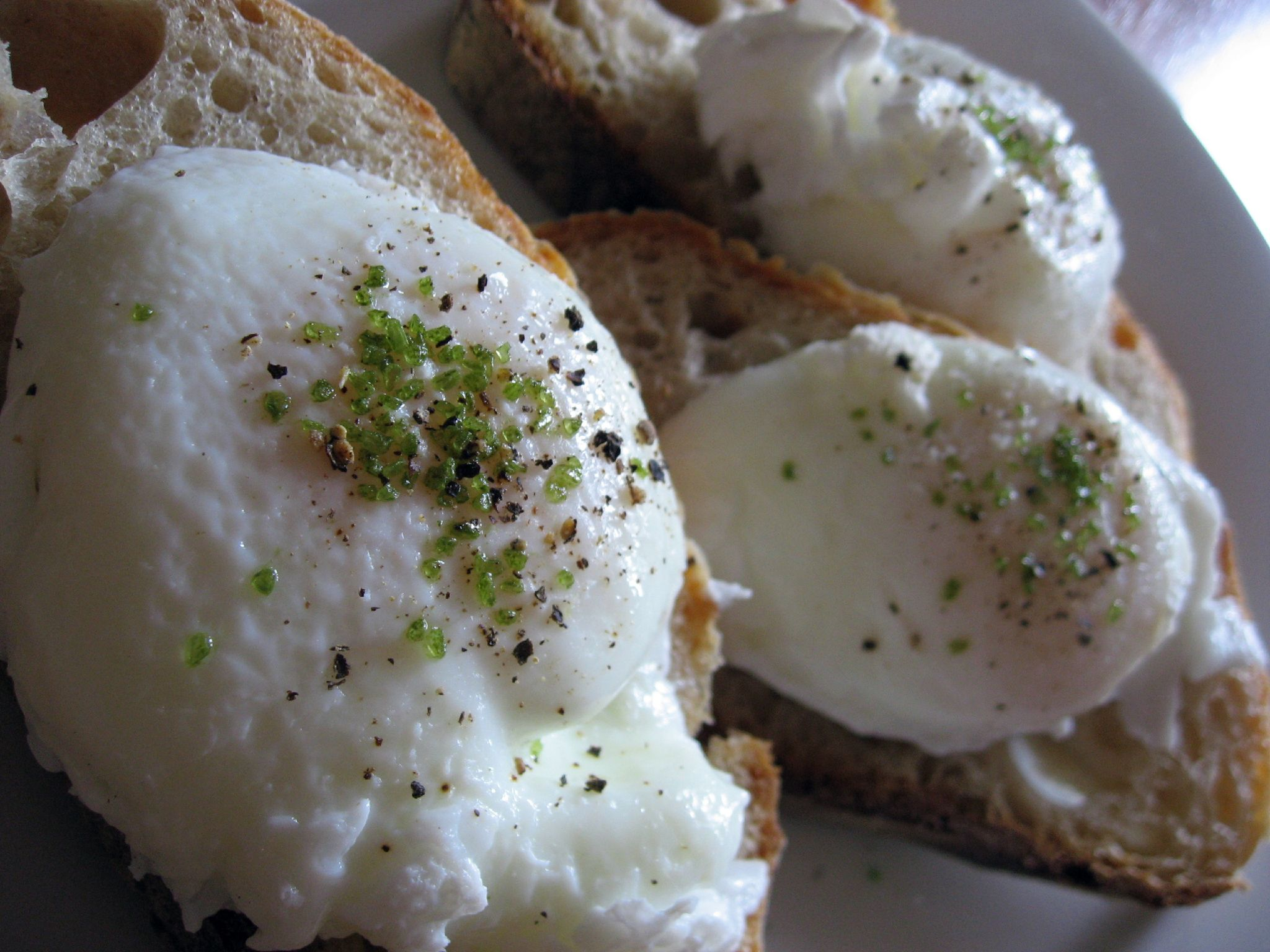
Poached eggs sprinkled with matcha and salt, served on sourdough bread

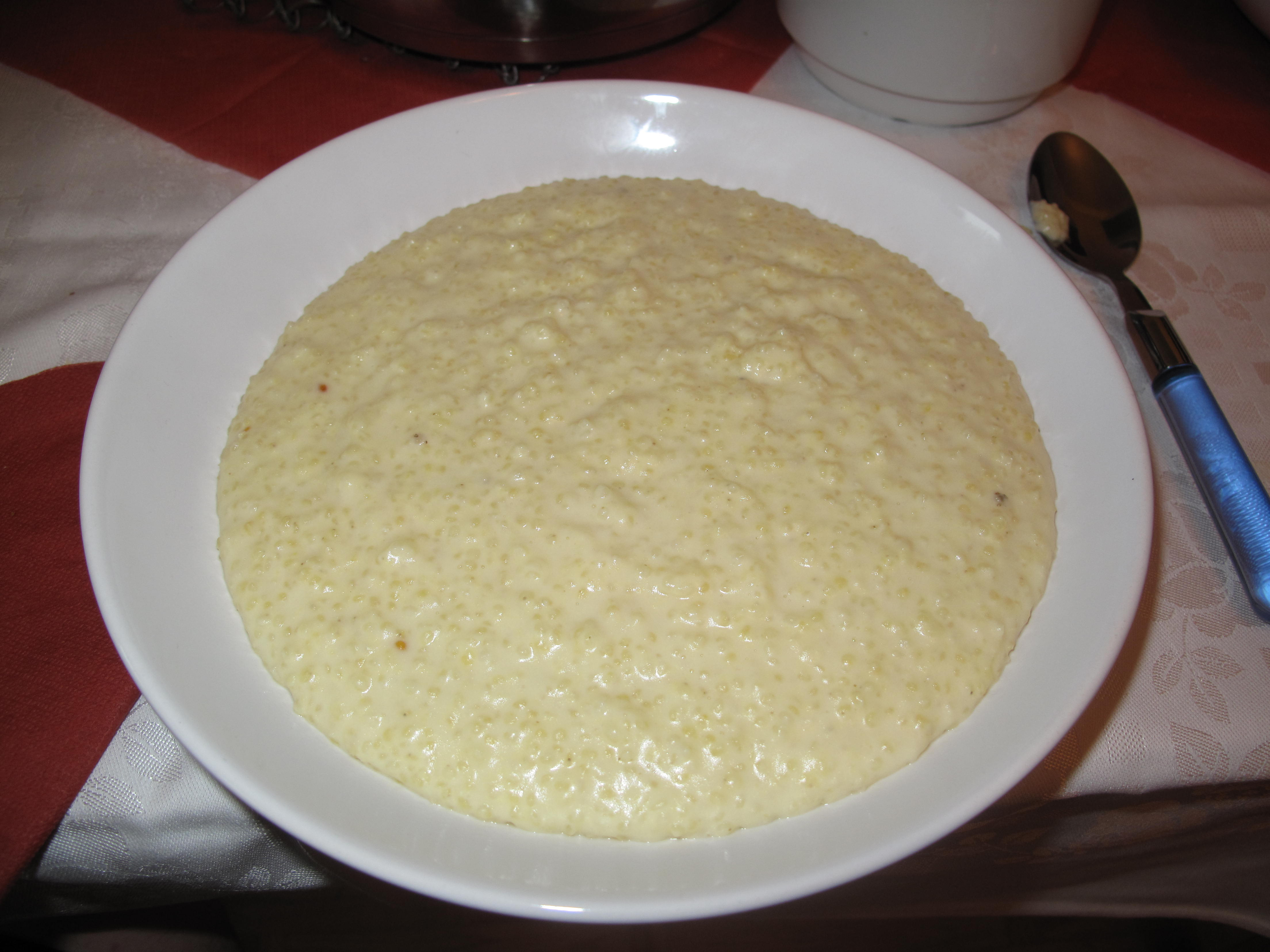
Millet porridge

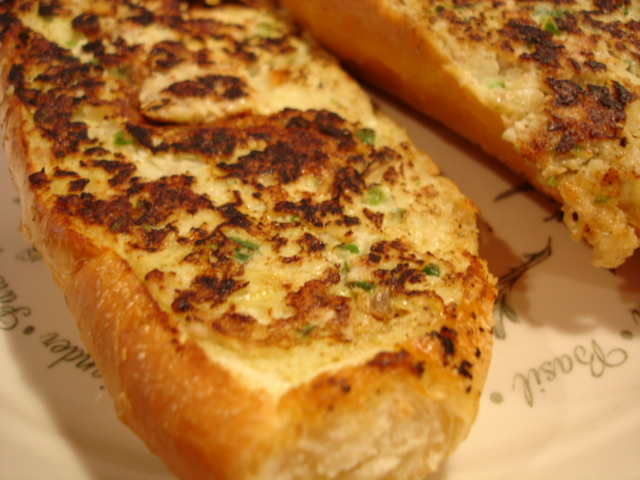
Roti john

- Pain au chocolat
- Pain aux raisins
- Palm syrup
- Palmier
- Pan de yuca – served for breakfast or with tea in Bolivia
- Pancake
- Pandebono – a breakfast food in Colombia

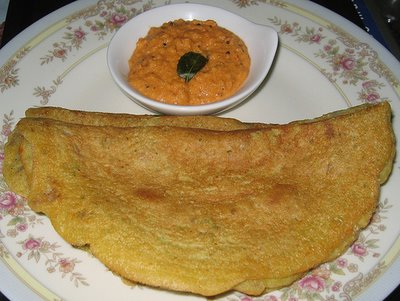
Pesarattu is a special breakfast in Andhra Pradesh, India.

- Pandesal – a common Philippine breakfast bread
- Pastry
- Paczki
- Peanut butter
- Peanut butter and jelly sandwich
- Pebete
- Pear
- Pekmez
- Perico
- Pesarattu – a breakfast crepe from Andhra Pradesh, India made with green gram
- Phitti – a hunza bread that is a common breakfast food
- Pho - Vietnamese beef noodle soup
- Pisca Andina
- Poached egg
- Poha
- Pop-Tarts
- Popcorn cereal – popcorn with milk and a sweetener; consumed by Americans in the 1800s
- Popover
- Pork brains and eggs
- Pork roll – a staple of New Jersey since 1856. Today it is traditionally served with egg and cheese on a hard roll and topped with salt, pepper, and ketchup. In North Jersey all pork roll may be referred to by the brand "Taylor Ham".
- Porridge
- Portuguese sweet bread
- Potato cake
- Potato pancake
- Potato scone
- Potatoes O'Brien
- Protein bar
- Pumpkin bread
- Puttu

=== Q ===
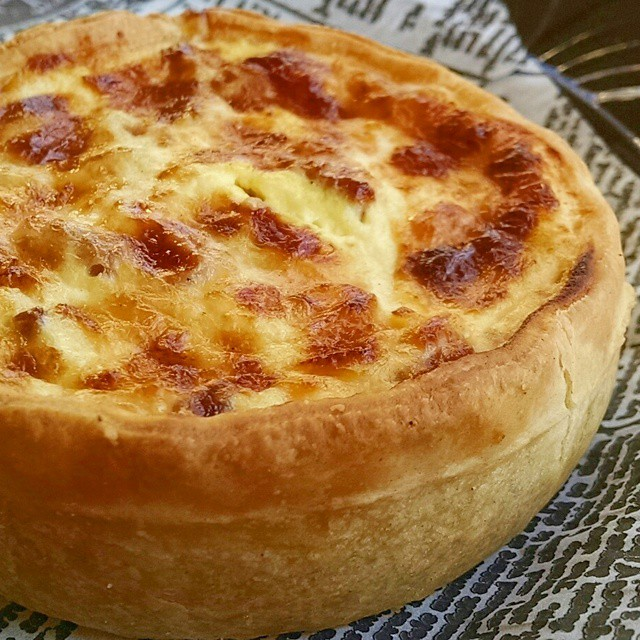
- Ham and cheese quiche
  Quiche
- Quick bread

=== R ===
- Raisin bran
- Raisin bread
- Reindeer meat
- Rice
- Rolled oats
- Roti canai
- Roti prata
- Run down – a traditional Jamaican breakfast dish prepared with salt mackerel, coconut milk, tomato and various vegetable and spices

=== S ===
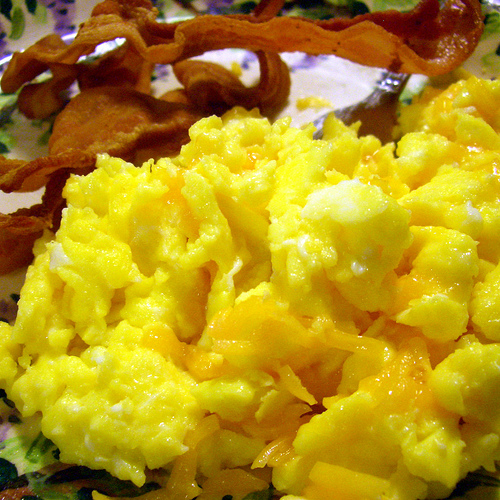
Scrambled eggs with bacon

- Sabaayad – Meal in Somalia and Djibouti
- Sabudana Khichdi - common Indian breakfast eaten during Navaratri
- Salmon – Fish used for eating
- Salt cod – Preserved fish
- Sandwich – Food made with bread and other ingredients
- Satti – Southeast Asian form of kebab
- Sausage – Meat product
- Sausage gravy – Breakfast dish from the Southern United States
- Scone – Baked goods
- Scrambled eggs – Culinary egg dish
- Scrapple – American pork offal meat loaf
- Shakshouka – Maghrebi dish of eggs poached in a sauce
- Shaobing – Flatbread from Chinese cuisine
- Shengjian mantou – Chinese pan-fried steamed bun dish
- Shirred egg – Egg dish
- Shrimp and grits – American dish in the Carolinas and Georgia
- Silog – Class of Filipino breakfast dishes
- Simit – a Turkish snack bread and breakfast food
- Sizzlean – Former American food product
- Slinger – a breakfast food that originated in St. Louis, Missouri

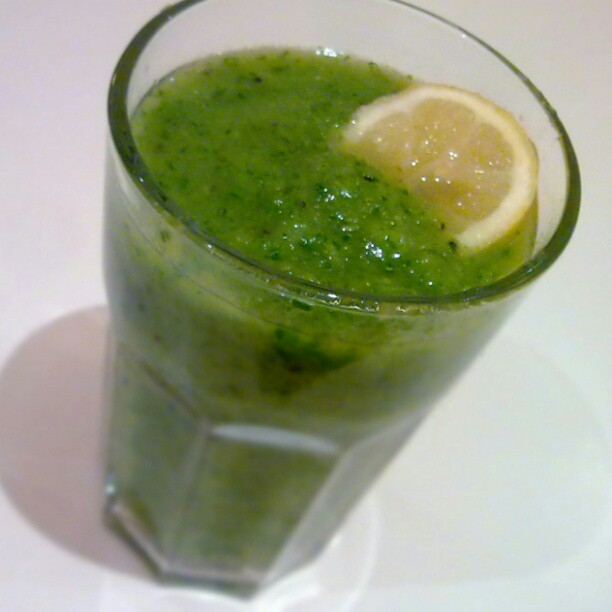
A green smoothie

- Smoothie – Drink made from fruit or vegetables
- Soft-boiled eggs
- Soufflé – Egg-based baked dish
- Sopapillas – Fried pastry of Latin America and the United States
- Stamp and Go – Jamaican fritter
- Strata – American egg dish
- Strudel – Type of layered pastry
- Suhur – Islamic meal eaten before dawn time during Ramadan
- Syrniki – Fried quark pancakes from Eastern European cuisine

=== T ===
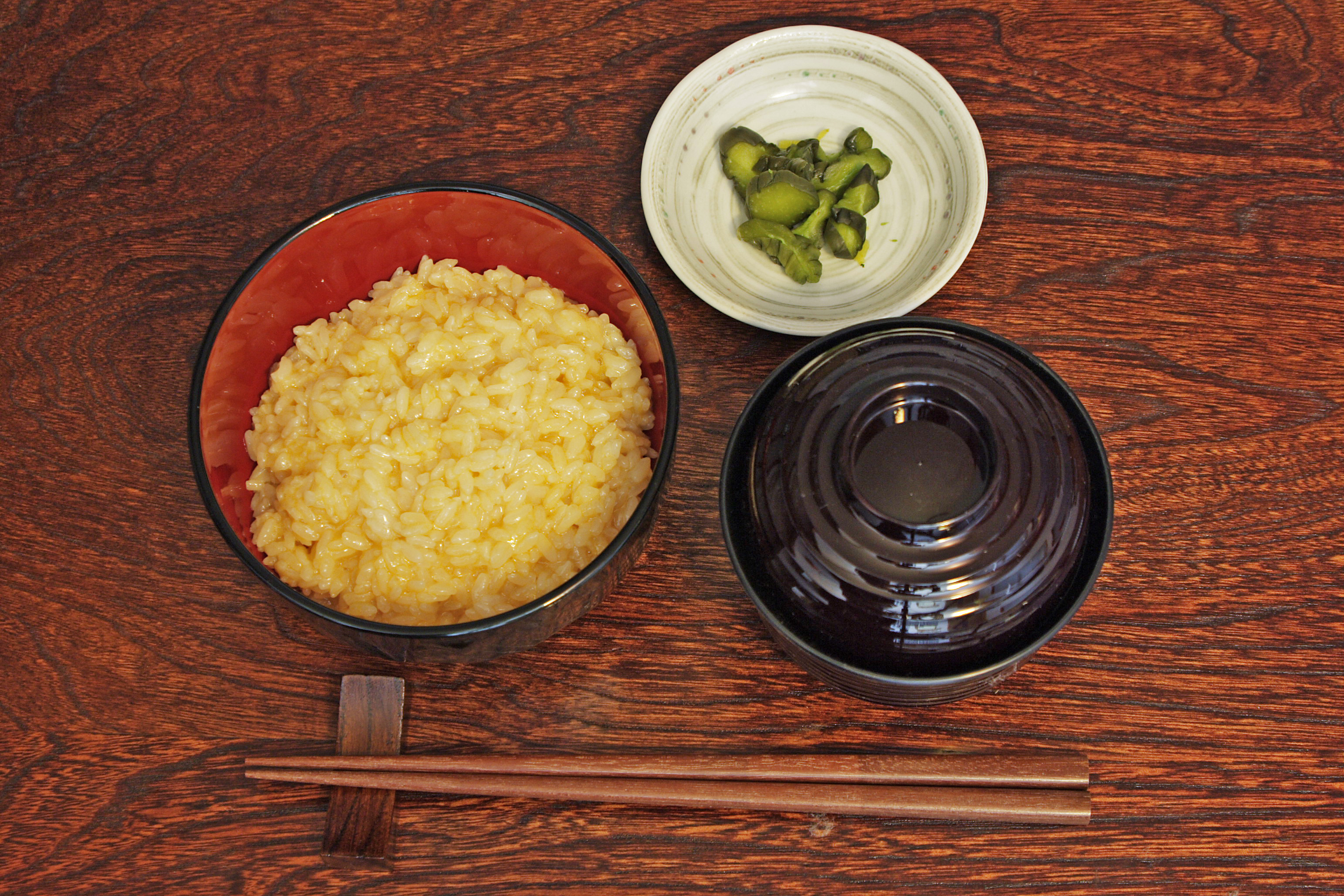
Tamago kake gohan (left), with tsukemono and miso soup

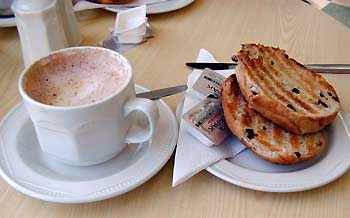
A toasted English teacake (right) shown with a caffè mocha

- Tacos
- Tamago kake gohan – a Japanese breakfast food consisting of cooked rice topped or mixed with raw egg, and optionally, soy sauce
- Tapsilog – A Filipino dish consisting in marinated beef cuts, egg and fried rice. Is usually accompanied by slices of onions, tomatoes and cucumbers.
- Taylor ham
- Teacake
- Texas toast
- Throdkin
- Tian mo – a traditional breakfast soup from the city of Jinan in the Shandong province of China; made of millet powder, peanuts, vermicelli, cowpea, spiced tofu (or shredded tofu skin), and spinach
- Toast
- Toaster Strudels
- Tomato omelette
- Tongue
- Tongue toast
- Touton
- Tripe

=== U ===
- Upma dosa

=== V ===
- Viennoiserie – Type of baked goods and dough

=== W ===
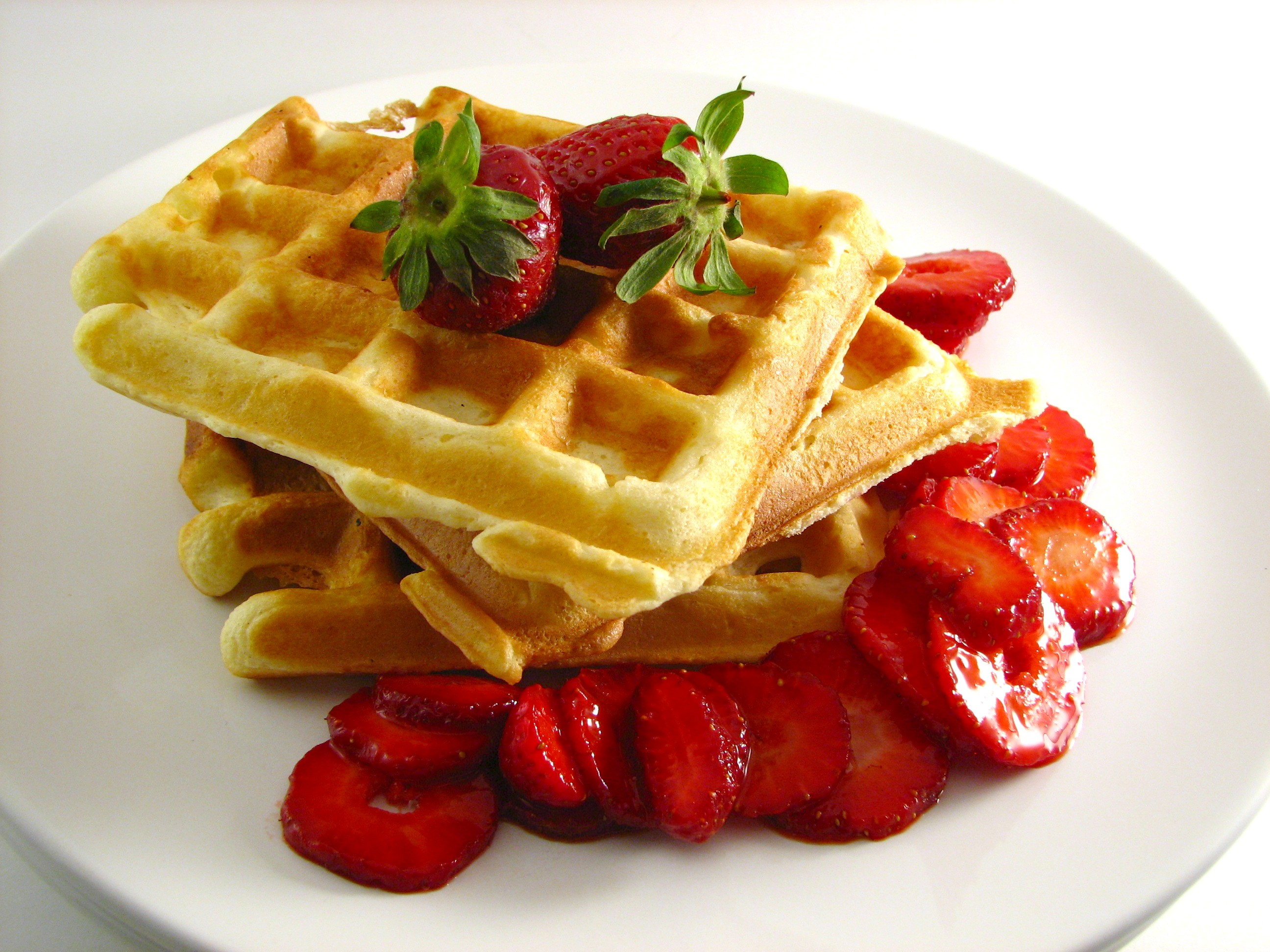
Waffles with strawberries

- Waffle – Batter- or dough-based food
- Water biscuit – Type of biscuit or cracker
- Weisswurst – Traditional Bavarian sausage
- Wrap roti – in Thailand, roti is often eaten for breakfast dipped in sauces.

=== X ===
- Xôi – Vietnamese rice dish

=== Y ===
- Yogurt – Food produced by bacterial fermentation of milk
- Youtiao – Deep-fried pastry of Chinese origin
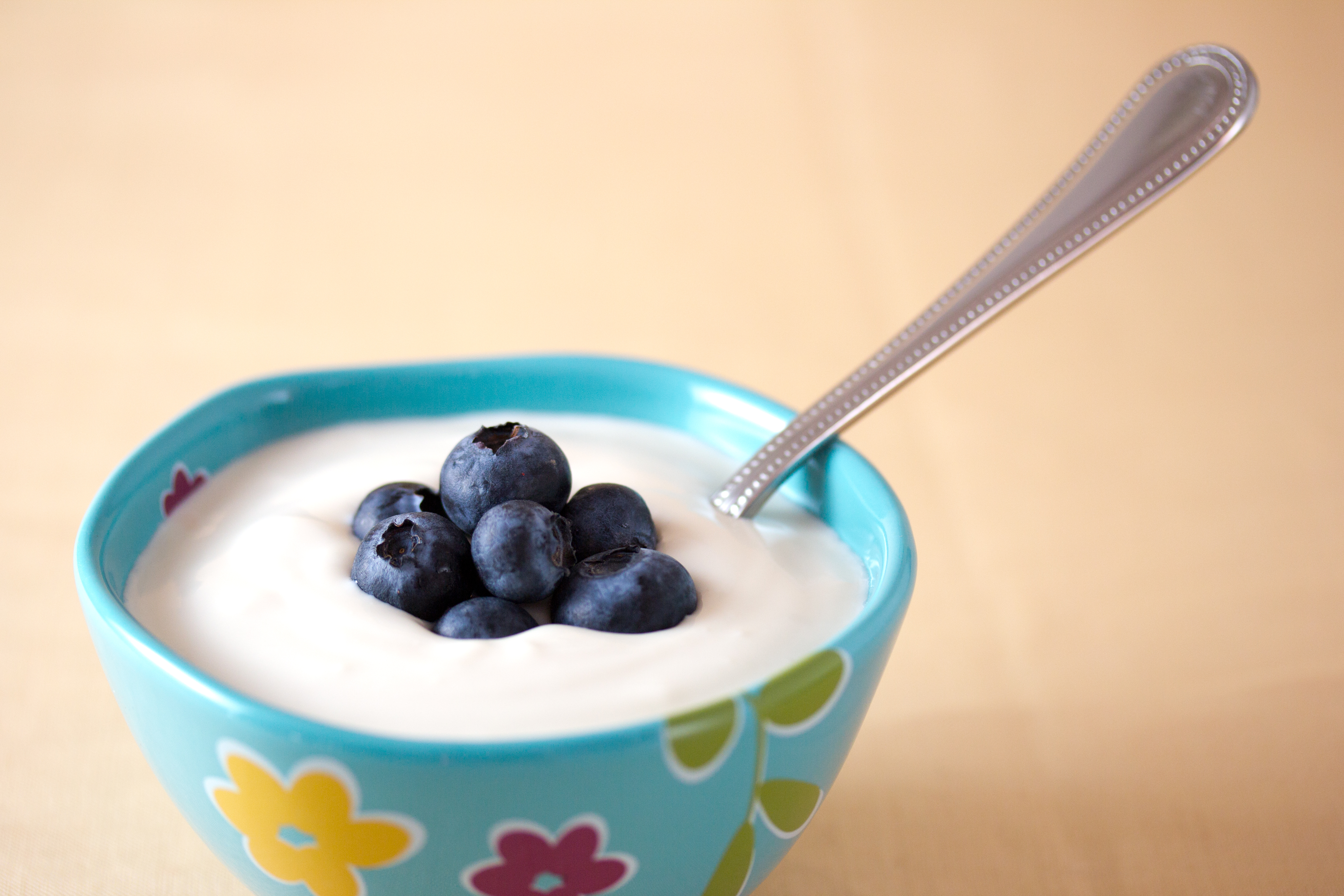
Vegan yogurt with blueberries

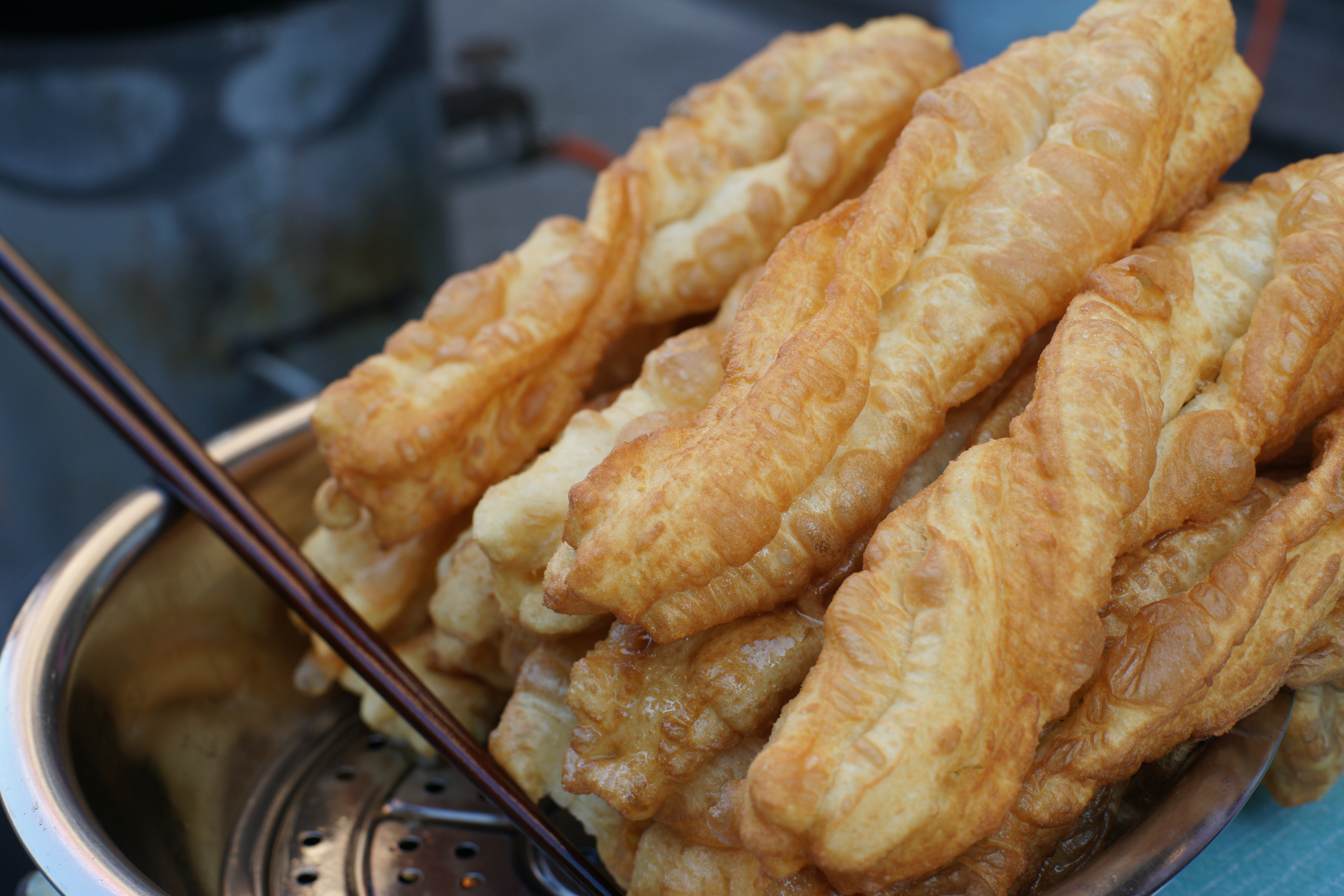
Youtiao

=== Z ===
- Zucchini bread - Bread made from zucchini.

== See also ==
- History of breakfast
- List of breakfast beverages
- List of breakfast cereals
- List of breakfast topics
- List of brunch foods

== Bibliography ==
- Wiley, Harvey Washington (1917). Foods and their adulteration. P. Blakiston's Son & Co. pp. 267–269.
