= TKG =

TKG can refer to:

- Radin Inten II Airport in Bandar Lampung, Indonesia
- Tamago kake gohan, a Japanese breakfast dish of rice and egg
- Telkom (South Africa), a South African telecommunication corporation
- Tesaka Malagasy, a dialect of Malagasy
