= Meurette =

Red wine sauce

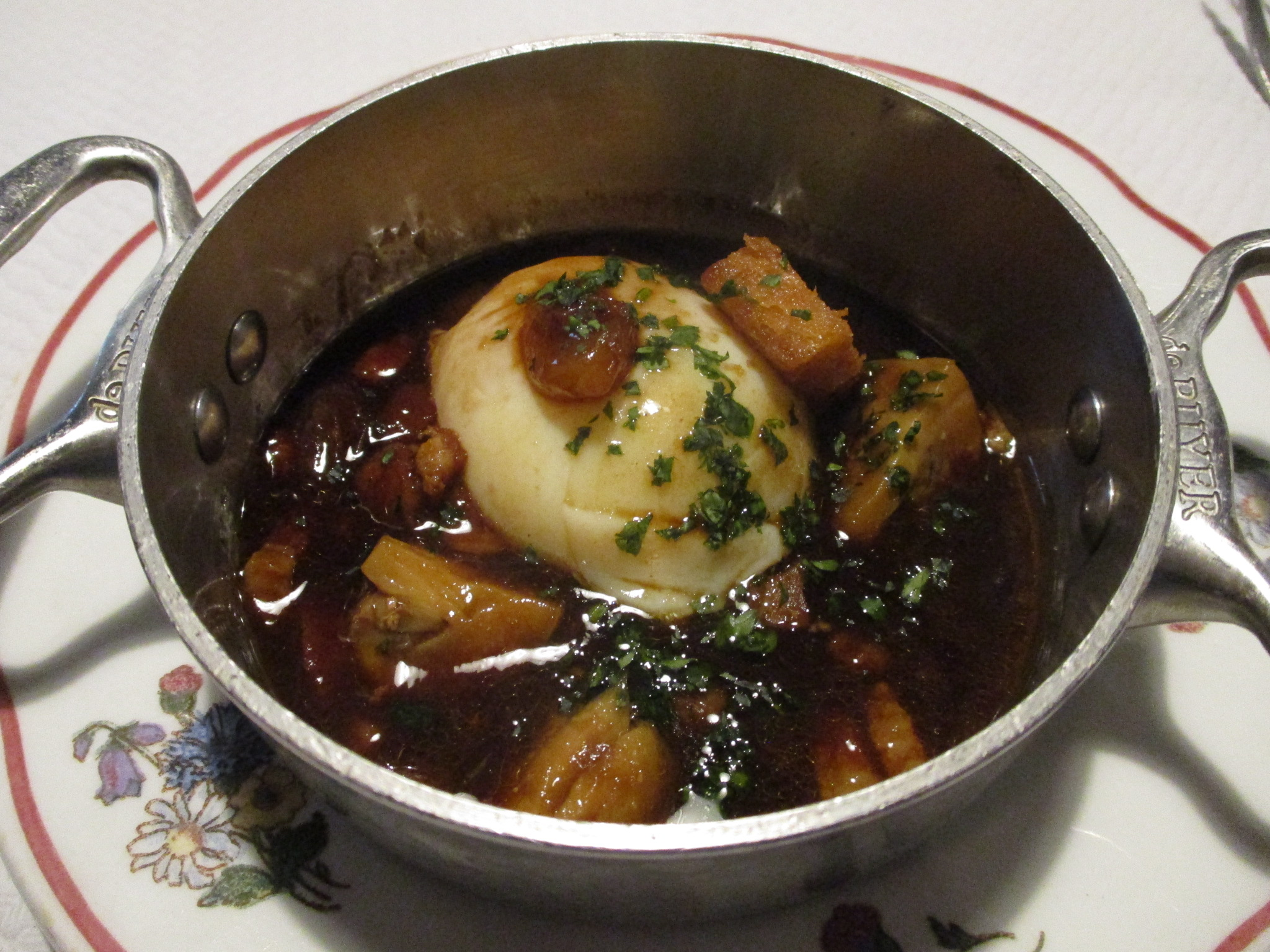
Meurette with egg

Meurette (French pronunciation: [mœʁɛt]) is:

- a red wine sauce cooked with bacon, onions, shallots, mushrooms and various spices. This sauce used in oeufs en meurette and many other preparations in French cuisine.
- a regional term for the fish stew with the generic name matelote.

== Sources ==
- Behr, Edward (2011). The Art of Eating Cookbook. Berkeley, Los Angeles and London: University of California Press. ISBN 978-0-520-27029-9.
- Montagné, Prosper (1976). Larousse Gastronomique. London: Hamlyn. OCLC 1285641881.
