= Breakfast pizza =

Pizza with breakfast-associated toppings

Example of a breakfast pizza

Breakfast pizza is pizza with ingredients often associated with breakfast, such as bacon and egg. A cake company in Pennsylvania claims to have originated the dish in the 1990s. In 2026, a writer for Phoenix Magazine said, "The origins of breakfast pizza are murky, but many pizza afficionados point to Casey's General Stores, a Midwest convenience store chain that began making the savory morning pies in 2001."

Brands and companies that have made frozen breakfast pizzas include DiGiorno and Red Baron. 7-Eleven has also served breakfast pizzas. Domino's Pizza has served breakfast pizza in Australia, as well as Dayton, Ohio.

== See also ==
- List of breakfast foods
- List of pizza varieties by country
