= Perico (food) =

Egg dish from Venezuela and Colombia

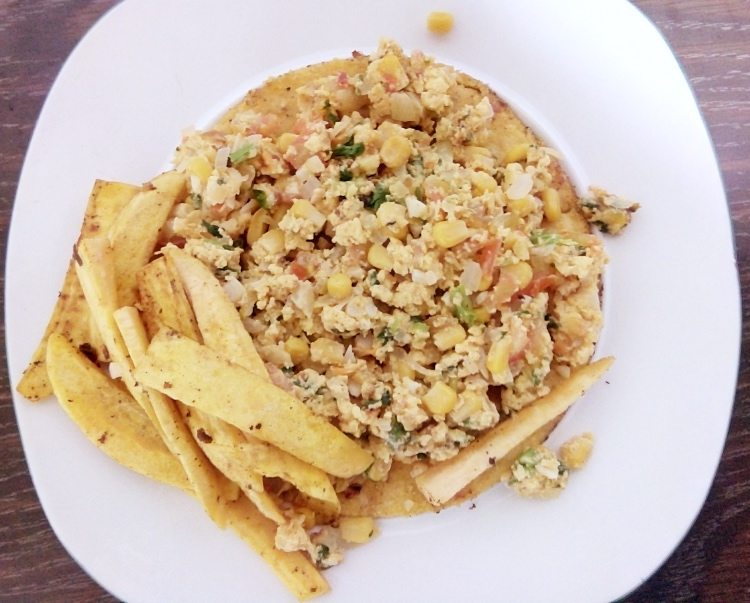
Huevos pericos

In Colombian and Venezuelan cuisine, perico is a dish prepared with scrambled eggs, butter, sautéed diced onions, bell pepper, and tomatoes. Scallions are a frequent substitution or addition to the onions, especially in Colombia. Huevos pericos may also include chopped cilantro greens, annatto for coloring, and occasionally hot peppers. It can be regarded as a tropical version of scrambled eggs and can be eaten alone, with bread, usually at breakfast time; or at any time, as an arepa filling.

The name comes from the bright colors of the scallions, tomato, peppers and eggs, mimicking the colors of a parrot (perico).

== See also ==
- Calentado
- Bandeja paisa
- List of egg dishes
