= Kokosbrood =

External videos
- How is coconut bread made? - Het Klokhuis, 2016

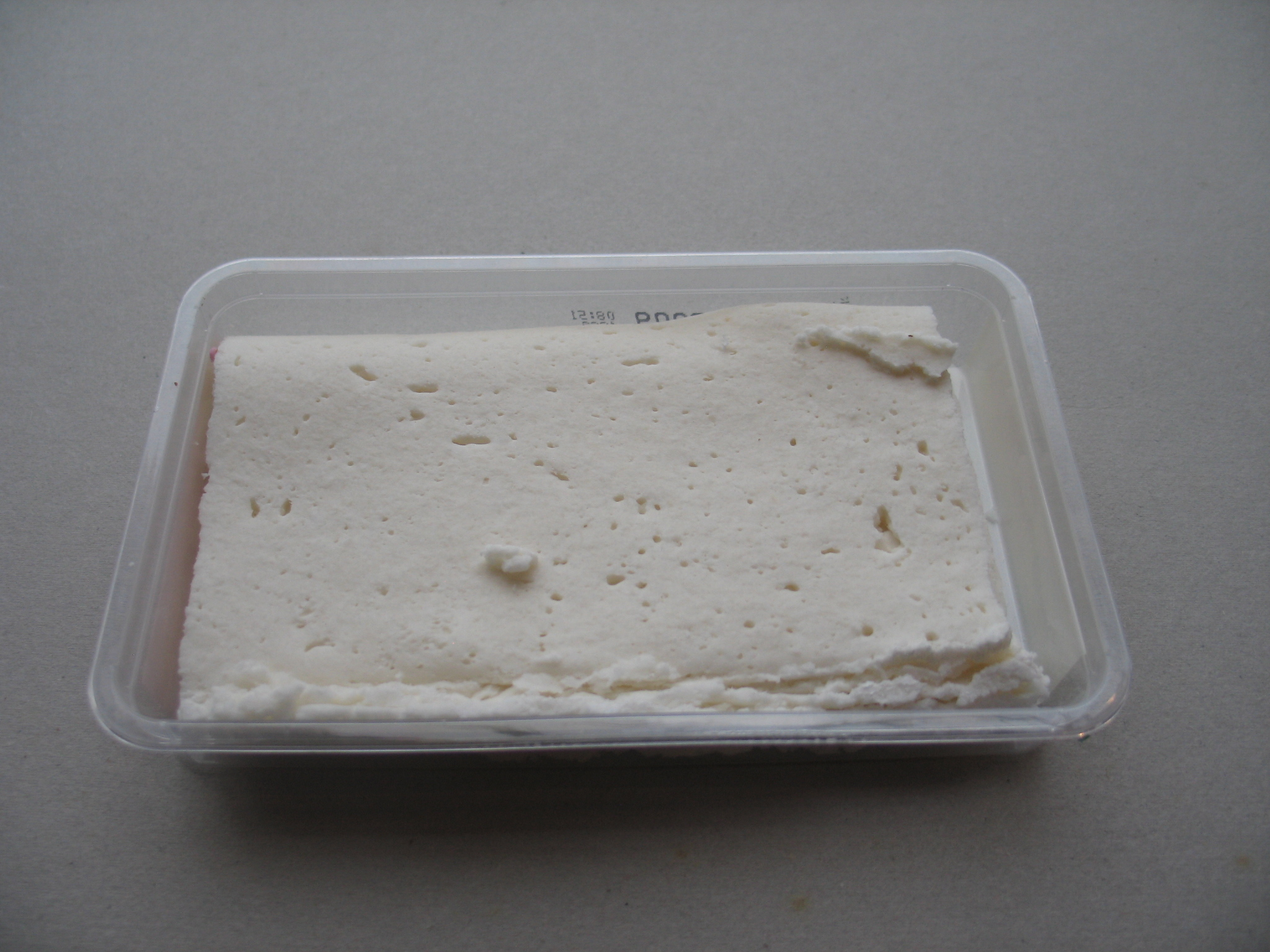
A packet of slices of plain Kokosbrood

Kokosbrood (Dutch: [ˈkoːkoːzˌbroːt]; lit. 'coconut bread') is a sandwich topping made of coconut meat which is dried, shredded, and pressed into a loaf mould. Wheat starch and glucose are added to the coconut mix and the loaf. Now sold in pre-sliced packets, traditionally local corner stores would sell slices cut to order from the whole loaf.

It is a popular breakfast food of the Netherlands, due to its colonial history, and is produced with various flavours including chocolate and raspberry.
