= Chocolate gravy =

Gravy made with cocoa powder

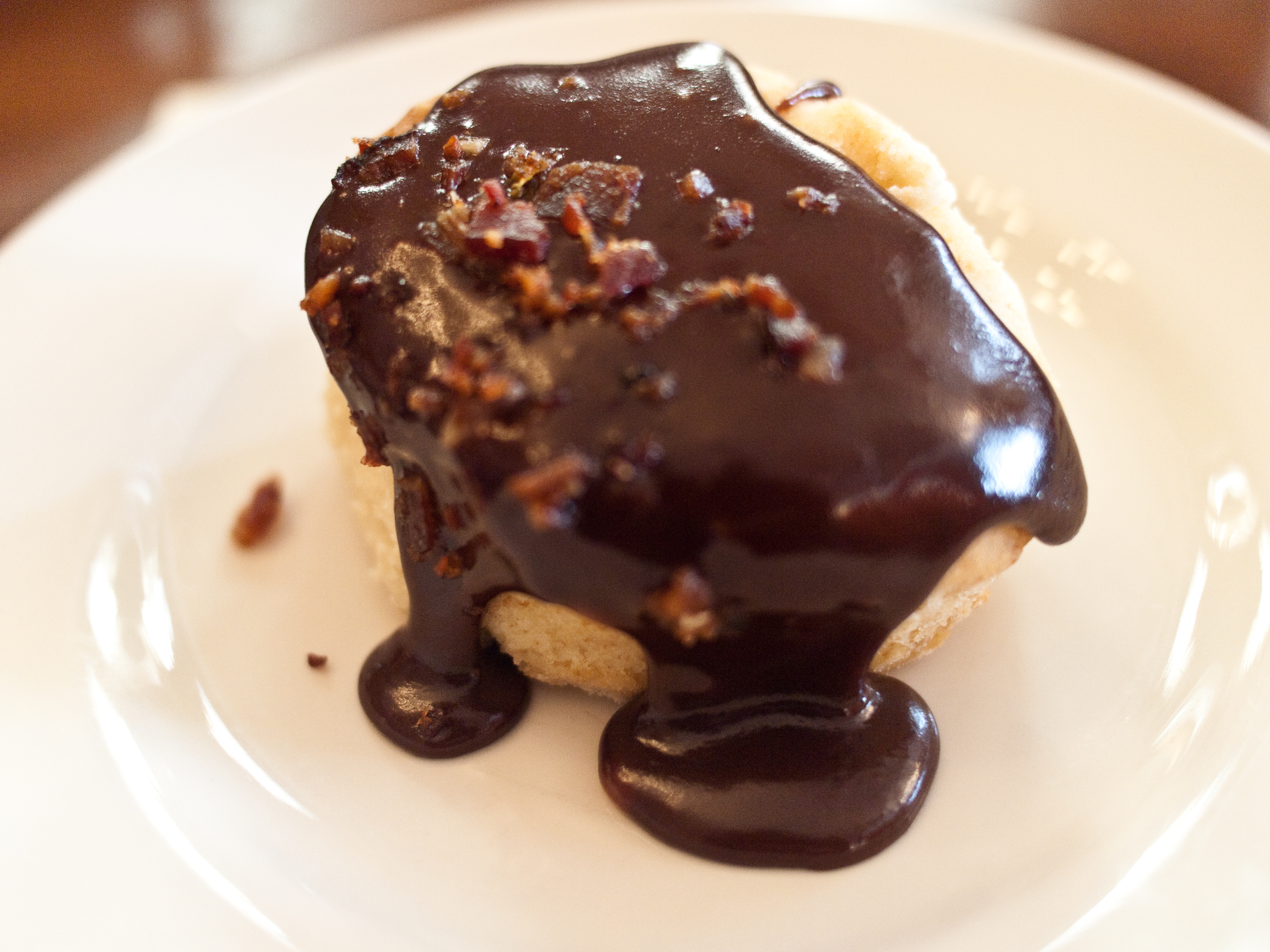
Gravy made with bacon, cocoa, and milk, served over buttermilk biscuits

Chocolate gravy is a variety of gravy made with cocoa powder, sugar, butter and flour and is part of traditional Appalachian cuisine. It is most often served as a Sunday morning dish with fresh biscuits in the Ozark and Appalachian Mountain regions.

== History ==
The origins of chocolate gravy are unknown. The Oxford Encyclopedia of Food and Drink in America describes it as a traditional part of Melungeon cuisine. It theorizes that chocolate gravy might be connected to the use of chocolate in Mexican cuisine, having been transmitted through trade between Spanish Louisiana and the Tennessee Valley. Professor Fred Sauceman theorized that it might have developed more recently as Hershey's cocoa powder became popular in the United States.

== Description ==
Typical chocolate gravy recipes call for milk, sugar, cocoa powder, flour and a fat such as butter lard, or bacon grease. Milk is commonly used as the liquid in chocolate gravy, while some recipes use water. Some recipes devised in eastern Oklahoma use more sugar, and butter is added after the gravy is complete, making it similar to warm chocolate pudding served over biscuits. In a traditional gravy, a roux is made with fat and flour before the milk is added; in chocolate gravy all the dry ingredients are mixed first, milk slowly incorporated, then stirred continuously until cooked. When a thick and rich consistency is achieved, the butter and vanilla are added. Other ingredients, such as crumbled bacon, are usually added afterward near the end of preparation.

== See also ==
- List of gravies
