= Barley honey =

Japanese breakfast food

Barley honey is a Japanese product prepared with barley starch, and it is typically combined with rice flour. It is often consumed as part of breakfast.
