= Diyabath =

Sri Lankan cold soup

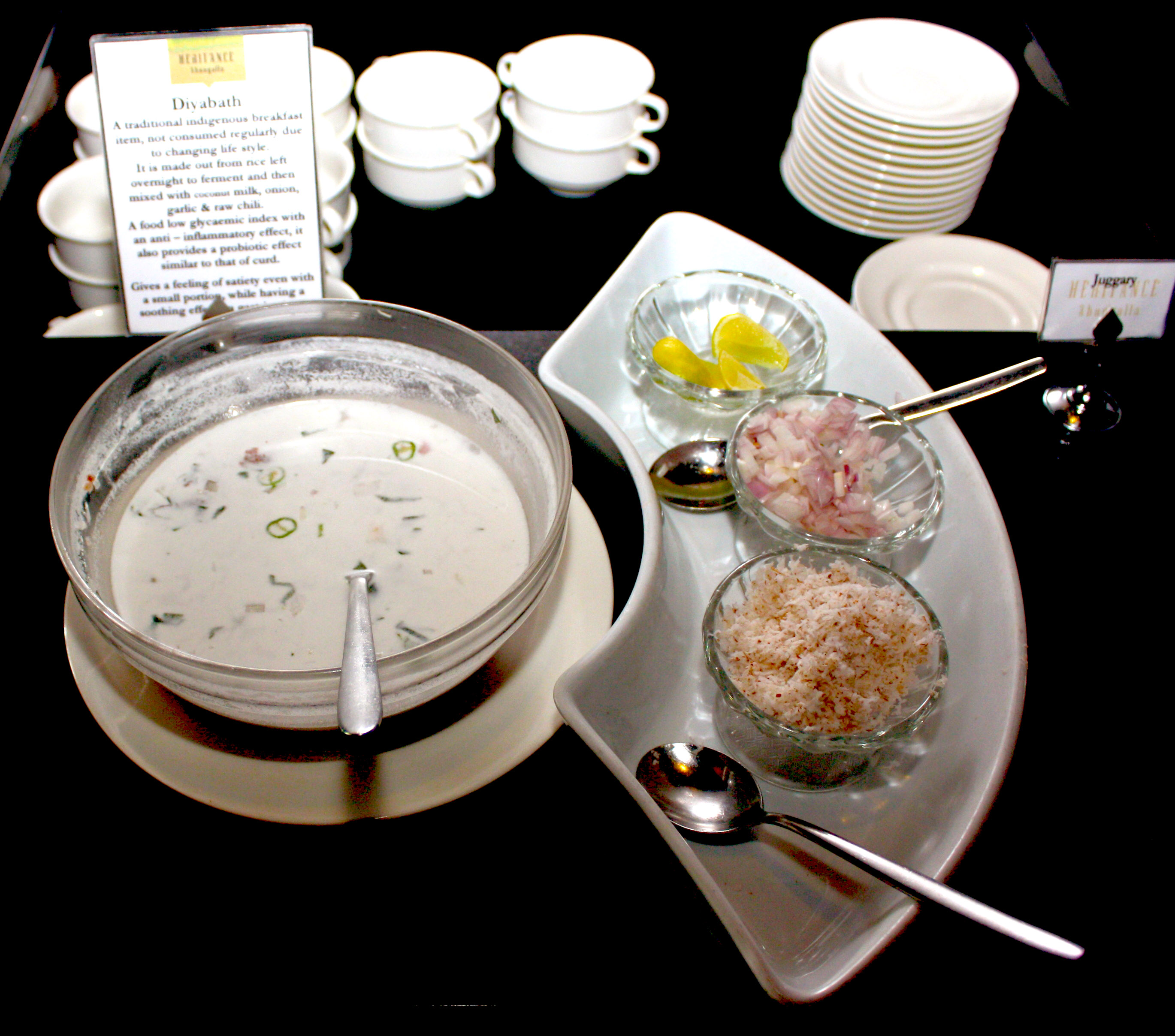
- Alternative names: Bath kenda Lunu kenda Palan kanji
- Type: Soup
- Course: Breakfast
- Place of origin: Sri Lanka
- Region or state: Island wide
- Created by: Mostly by Sinhala villagers but Tamil also.
- Serving temperature: Cold
- Main ingredients: Rice, coconut milk, onions, garlic, raw chili Or black pepper
- Variations: Coconut milk added or water added .
- Other information: Diyabath is also a ayurvedic dietery treatment for gastritis.it should be taken early in the morning without taking a bed tea.

Diyabath is a cold soup, traditionally consumed by the indigenous people of Sri Lanka as a breakfast item. It is made from rice left overnight to ferment and then mixed with coconut milk, onion, garlic and raw chili. It is not consumed regularly due to changing lifestyle.

With a low glycaemic index and an anti-inflammatory effect, it also provides a probiotic effect similar to that of curd. It gives a feeling of satiety even with a small portion, while having a soothing effect on gastric ulcers.

This dish is called "Palan Kanji" (Old Porridge) in southern India. It is prepared a little differently from in Sri Lanka. Most Indian people do not add coconut milk since coconut is more expensive in India. Mostly, they burn a piece of dried fish using fire (from a firewood stove) to have this rice.

== See also ==
- Dal bhat
- Okroshka
- Cuisine of Sri Lanka
