= Oeufs en meurette =

French egg dish

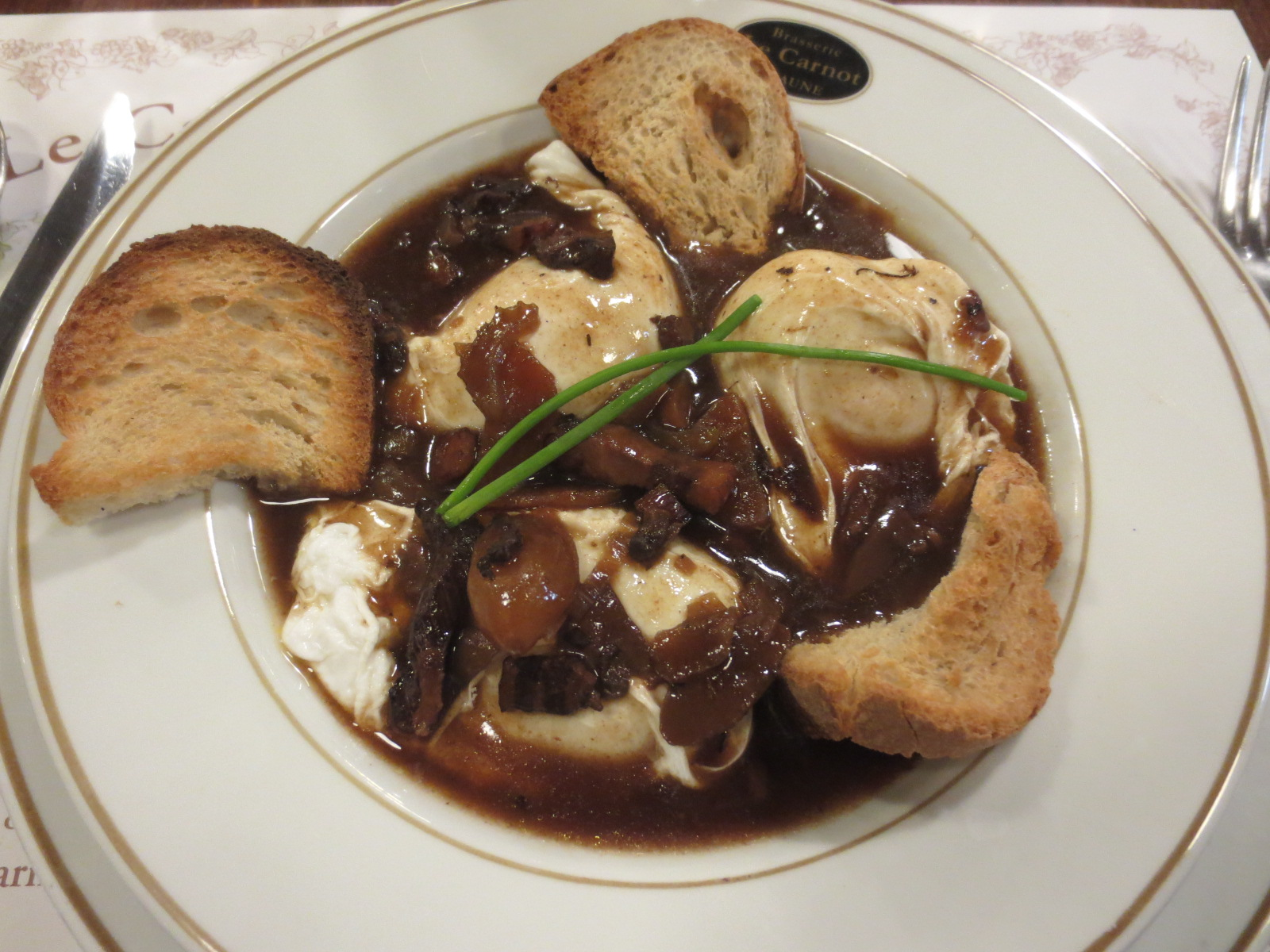
Œufs en meurette, paired with bread slices

Oeufs en meurette is a traditional dish from Burgundian cuisine based on poached eggs and meurette sauce or bourguignon sauce.

== Description ==
The dish is made with poached eggs accompanied by a meurette sauce/bourguignon sauce (made up of Burgundy red wine, bacon, onions and shallots browned in butter) and served with toasted garlic bread.

It is the main dish of the Château du Clos de Vougeot, being the only dish served at receptions and weddings organized there.

== See also ==
- Burgundy wine
- Egg (food)
- List of brunch foods
- Poached egg
