= Tamago kake gohan =

Japanese breakfast dish of rice and egg

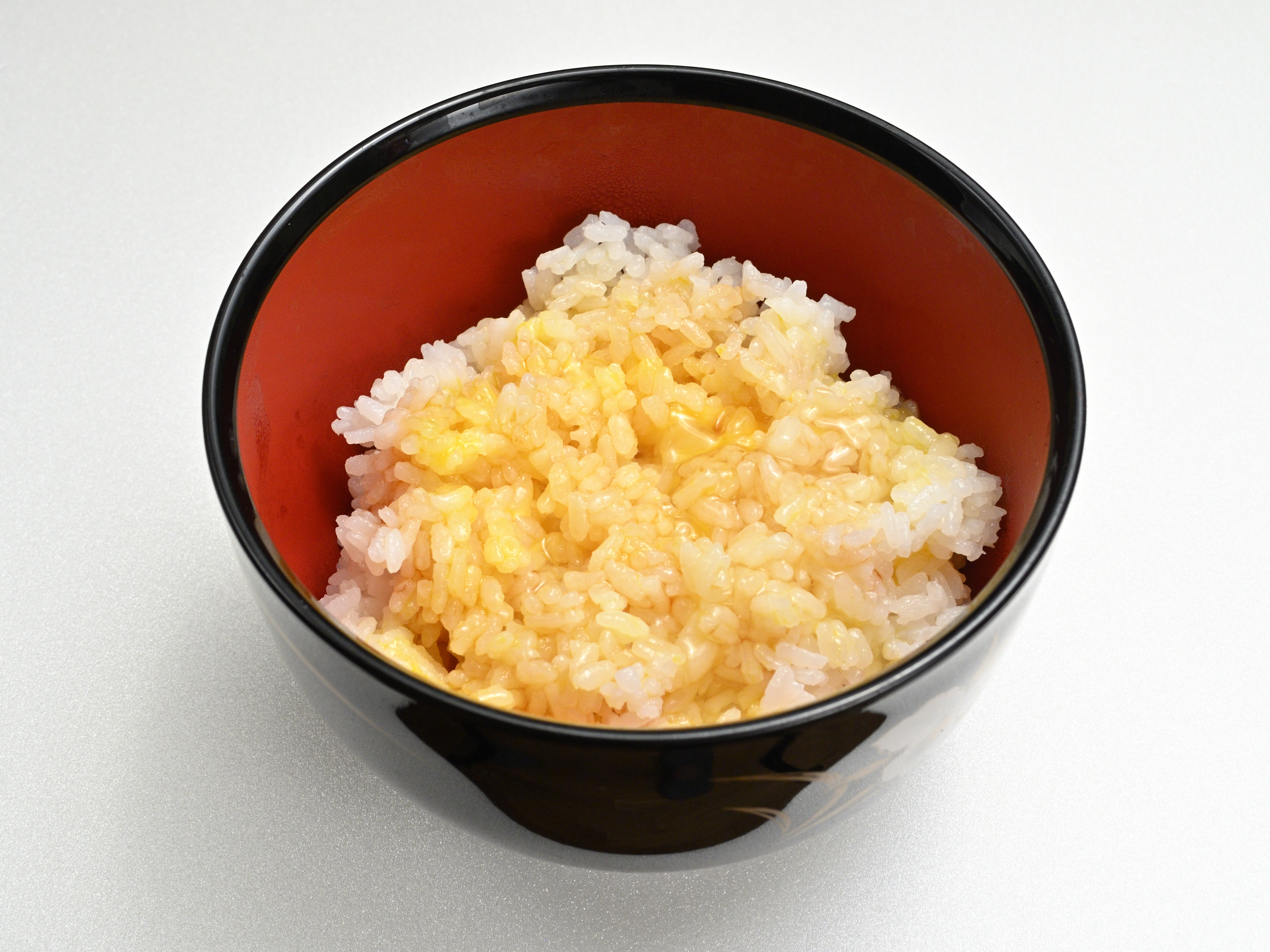
- Tamago kake gohan
- Alternative names: 卵かけご飯
- Type: Rice dish
- Place of origin: Japan
- Serving temperature: Warm or hot rice, raw egg
- Main ingredients: Rice, raw chicken egg, soy sauce
- Ingredients generally used: Scallions (negi), nori, katsuobushi, natto, mentsuyu, wasabi
- Similar dishes: Medamayaki don, zosui

Tamago kake gohan (卵かけご飯; lit. 'egg on rice'), abbreviated TKG, is a popular Japanese breakfast food consisting of cooked Japanese rice topped or mixed with raw egg and soy sauce. It is sometimes referred to simply as tamago gohan (egg rice), tamago kake meshi (egg on rice/food), tamago bukkake gohan (egg splashed onto rice), or other variations.

The dish has sometimes been referred to as the "soul food of the Japanese", characterized by Japan's exceptionally high standards of egg hygiene which minimize the risk of Salmonella poisoning from raw eggs. This allows the cultural practice of consuming raw eggs, combined with the staple food of rice, to flourish.

== Description ==
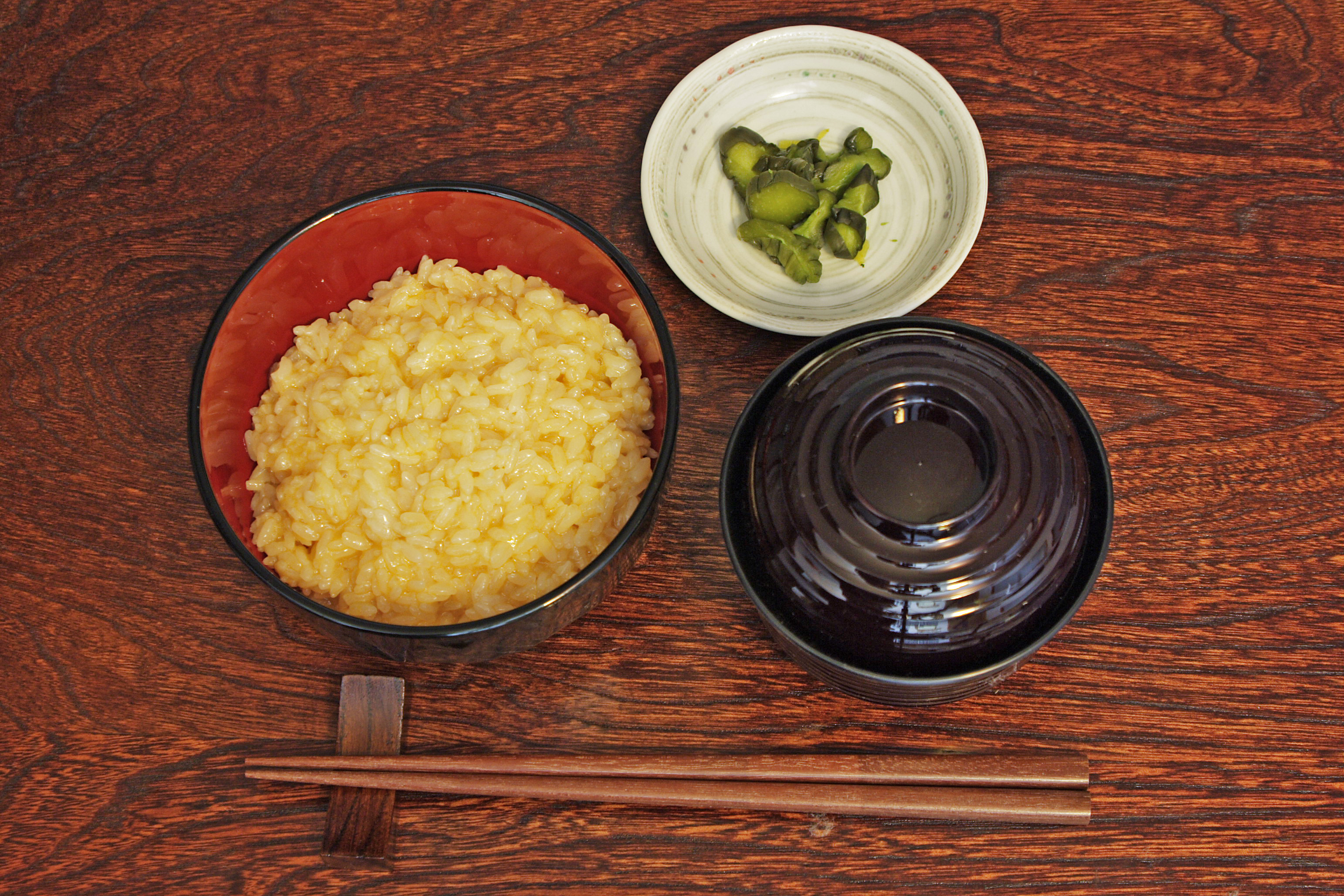
Tamago kake gohan (left), along with tsukemono and miso soup

Cooked Japanese rice is topped or mixed with a raw chicken egg, then seasoned, typically with soy sauce.

=== Preparation ===
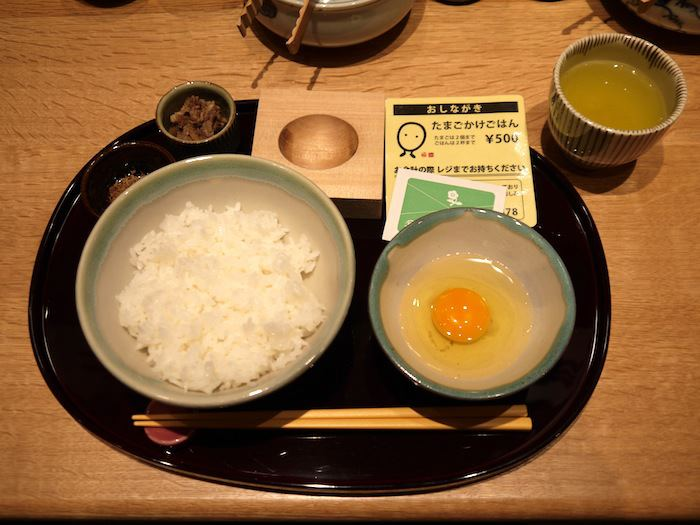
Rice and egg prior to mixing

A raw egg is mixed with a bowl of Japanese rice. The rice can be cold, freshly cooked, or reheated. The egg may be broken directly into the rice bowl (either before or after the rice is added), or beaten in a separate bowl beforehand. Some people make a well in the mound of rice to pour the egg into.

Variations on preparation include:

- Using only the egg yolk.
- Using specialized devices to whip the egg, particularly the egg white into a meringue-like foam before pouring over the rice. A cooking toy called the Kyūkyoku no TKG (Ultimate TKG) was marketed by Takara Tomy Arts in 2017 specifically for this purpose.

=== Seasonings and toppings ===
The most common seasoning is soy sauce. Other seasonings like mentsuyu (noodle soup base) or ponzu are also used.

Common additions include chopped scallions, nori (dried seaweed), katsuobushi (dried bonito flakes), shirasu (whitebait), tsukemono (pickles), wasabi, and nattō.

==== Specialized soy sauces and seasonings ====
Since the 2000s, dozens of soy sauces specifically designed for TKG have been marketed by various companies in Japan. These are typically less salty than regular soy sauce and often contain dashi (like kombu or katsuobushi extract) and mirin (sweet rice wine) to complement the egg and rice flavour. Notable examples include:

- Otamahan (おたまはん), developed by Yoshida Furusato Mura (a third-sector company) in Unnan, Shimane (launched 2002).
- Tamago ni kakeru oshōyu (たまごにかけるお醤油, Soy Sauce for Pouring on Egg), by Teraoka Yuki Jōzō in Fukuyama, Hiroshima.
- Tamago kake gohan ni kakeru shōyu (玉子かけご飯にかける醤油, Soy Sauce for Pouring on Tamago Kake Gohan), by Hamada Shōyu in Kumamoto.
- Higeta Tamago kake gohan ni dōzo! (ヒゲタ たまごかけご飯にどうぞ!, Higeta - Please Use for Tamago Kake Gohan!), by Higeta Shōyu in Choshi, Chiba.
- Tamago ni kakeru dashi shōyu (たまごにかけるだし醤油, Dashi Soy Sauce for Pouring on Egg), by Igagoe Co., Ltd. in Iga, Mie.
- Kaketarō (かけたろう), by Jinushi Kyōwa Shōkai / Kokekokkō Republic in Taki, Mie.

Additionally, specialized furikake seasonings specifically for TKG are also available. Bull-Dog Sauce produced a seasoning mix called Ouchi de Gyūdon-fū Tamago Kake Gohan (おうちで 牛丼風 たまごかけご飯, Gyūdon-Style Tamago Kake Gohan at Home).

== History ==
Historically, Japanese consumption of animal products primarily focused on seafood. Influenced by Buddhist precepts against killing (sesshō) and the Shinto reverence for rice cultivation, meat from mammals and birds was often considered impure (kegare) and rarely eaten. Although domesticated chickens arrived in Japan during the Yayoi period, imperial edicts, such as those by Emperor Tenmu and Emperor Shōmu, forbade the killing and eating of certain animals, including chickens, and eggs were likely avoided as well.

During the Sengoku period and Edo period, contact with Europeans, particularly in Western Japan, introduced meat-eating habits and the consumption of eggs. Namban confectionery using eggs, such as castella and bōro, also arrived.

An early dish resembling TKG, called Tamago meshi (玉子飯, egg rice), appears in the 1805 cookbook Shirōto Hōchō (素人包丁, Amateur Cooking). It involved pouring beaten egg over cooked rice and steaming it. In 1838, records from the Nabeshima clan (Onji Nikki) mention "Odonburi Namatamago" (御丼 生玉子, bowl of rice [with] raw egg) being served to guests.

The first person known to have eaten TKG in its modern, raw form was Kishida Ginkō (1833–1905), a pioneering journalist, around 1877. He reportedly recommended the dish to others. According to a 1927 magazine article describing Ginkō's habits, he seasoned it with salt and chili pepper (bansho).

Eggs were a luxury during the food shortages after World War II, but became widely affordable from the 1950s onwards. TKG then gained popularity for its taste and nutritional value.

=== Modern era ===
Since the 2000s, tamago kake gohan has seen a resurgence in popularity, marked by the development of specialized condiments, dedicated restaurants, regional promotion efforts, and export.

- 2005: The first "Japan Tamagokake Gohan Symposium" was held in Unnan, Shimane, leading to October 30th being registered as "Tamagokake Gohan Day" by the Japan Anniversary Association.
- 2006: Tankuma, considered a pioneering TKG specialty restaurant, opened in Toyooka, Hyōgo.
- 2008: A TKG-focused restaurant opened in Misaki, Okayama, the birthplace of Kishida Ginkō.
- Late 2000s: Efforts began to market TKG in Hong Kong, where raw egg consumption was traditionally uncommon.
- 2022-2023: Sakai Farm in Kuriyama, Hokkaido opened a direct sales shop with a TKG-focused eat-in space.

== Raw egg consumption ==
Consuming raw eggs carries a risk of Salmonella food poisoning. While common in Japan, eating raw eggs is considered unsafe in many other countries unless the eggs are pasteurized or irradiated.

=== Egg safety in Japan ===
Japan has exceptionally high standards for egg hygiene, making raw consumption relatively safe. These include:

- Strict breeding and farm management to reduce Salmonella prevalence in hens.
- Washing and sterilizing eggs at GP Centers (Grading and Packing facilities), often using hypochlorous acid solutions, before packaging.
- A best-before date system based on the assumption of raw consumption. Most producers set this date at about two weeks from packing, after which eggs are still considered safe if cooked thoroughly.
- A cold chain distribution system maintaining low temperatures from farm to retailer.

Despite these measures, the risk is not zero. Salmonella can contaminate eggs externally via feces or internally if the hen itself is infected. Consumers are advised not to use cracked eggs for raw consumption.

=== Nutritional aspects ===
The bioavailability of protein from raw eggs (51%) is significantly lower than from cooked eggs (91%). Additionally, raw egg whites contain avidin, which inhibits the absorption of biotin. Consuming large amounts of raw egg white over long periods can potentially lead to biotin deficiency. Conversely, some research suggests egg white protein may help lower high cholesterol levels.

=== International consumption ===
While less common globally due to safety concerns, TKG is gaining recognition internationally. Tourists visiting Japan often try it, and Japanese eggs produced under high hygiene standards are exported to places like Hong Kong and Singapore. Some countries have traditional dishes involving raw egg, such as steak tartare (Europe) and yukhoe (Korea).

== Cultural significance ==
TKG holds a significant place in Japanese food culture as a simple, quick, inexpensive, and familiar comfort food, often associated with breakfast or a light meal.

=== Events ===
- Japan Tamagokake Gohan Symposium: Held annually in Unnan, Shimane since 2005, originating from the development of the local TKG soy sauce "Otamahan." The symposium discusses the history and appeal of TKG and led to October 30th being designated "Tamagokake Gohan Day."
- Aspam Tamagokake Gohan Fair: Held in Aomori, Aomori in 2009 at the Aomori Prefecture Tourist Center Aspam.
- Guinness World Record - Town Revitalization Nippon: In Pippu, Hokkaido, on August 4, 2024, a Guinness World Record was set for the "most people making tamago kake gohan simultaneously." Proposed by local junior high students to promote the town's products (Yumepirika rice, "Kappa no Kenran" eggs, Pippu green onion soy sauce), 325 participants successfully made TKG within 5 minutes.

=== In popular culture ===
Tamago kake gohan appears frequently in Japanese media:

- Historical novels like Ryōtarō Shiba's Tobu ga Gotoku mention characters like Saigō Takamori enjoying TKG (though likely fictionalized). An essay by Shōtarō Ikenami describes the Forty-seven Rōnin eating a version with duck and negi (historical accuracy uncertain).
- The book 365 Nichi Tamago Kake Gohan no Hon (2007) introduced 365 variations and popularized the abbreviation "TKG" for creative tamago kake gohan recipes.
- The idol group Nama Ham to Yaki Udon has a song titled "Tamago Kake Gohan" (2015).

== See also ==
- Japanese cuisine
- List of egg dishes
- List of rice dishes
- Sukiyaki
- Chazuke
- Omurice
