= Net-filter coffee =

Traditional cloth-filter coffee brewing method in Ho Chi Minh City, Vietnam

Cà phê vợt
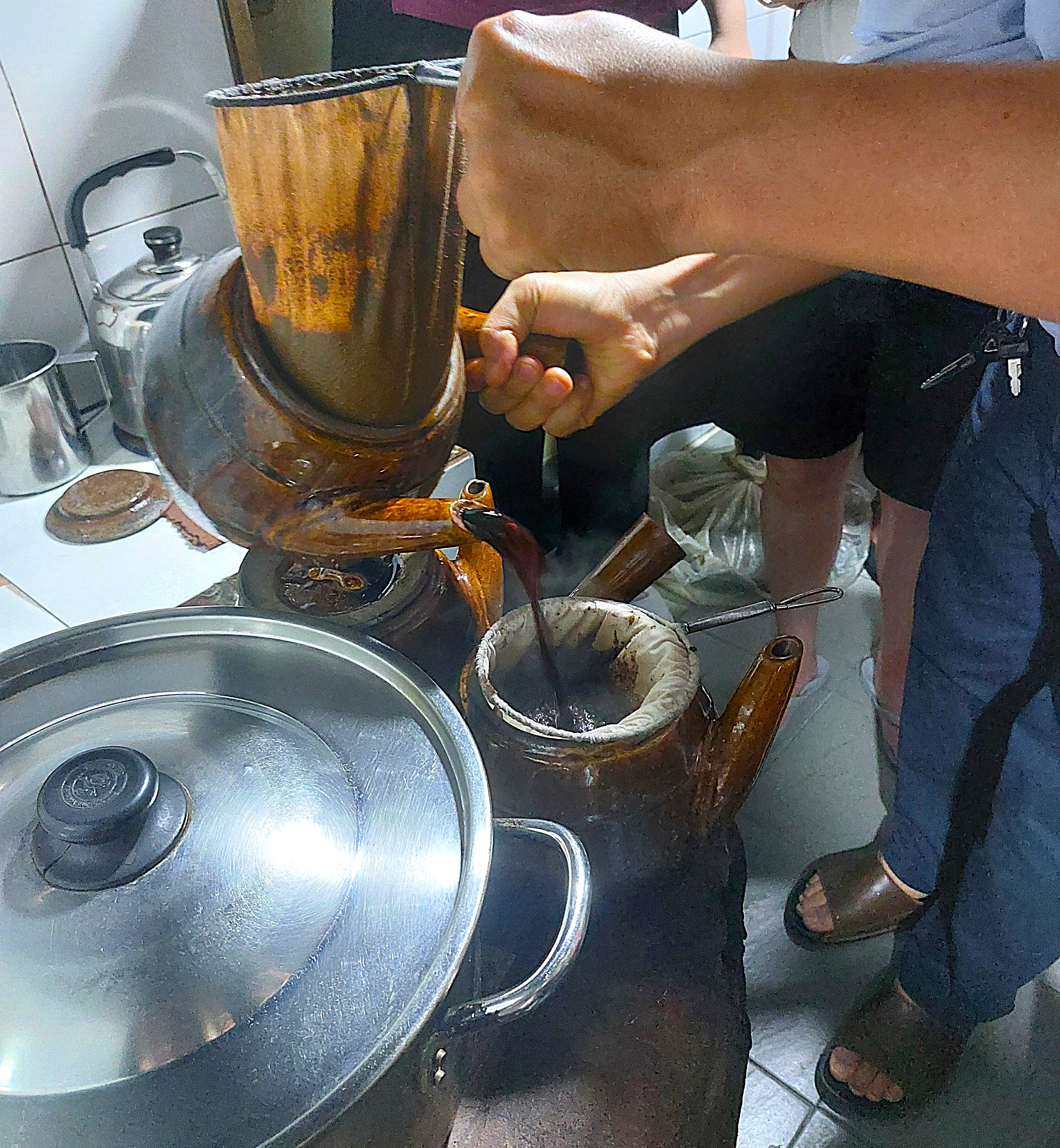
- Net-filter coffee brewed with a reusable cloth filter (vợt) in Ho Chi Minh City
- Type: Coffee preparation method
- Origin: Vietnam
- Served: Hot or iced

Cà phê vợt (cà phê vợt; also known as net-filter coffee) is a traditional method of brewing coffee in southern Vietnam, associated with cafes in alleys and market-adjacent stalls in Ho Chi Minh City (formerly Saigon). It uses a reusable cloth filter suspended in a metal ring to steep and strain ground coffee into a pot, producing coffee that is brewed in batches and kept warm for pour-out service.

Net-filter coffee differs from Vietnamese drip coffee made with a metal phin, which is brewed per cup rather than held in a serving pot. The method is linked with long-running small cafes and "old Saigon" coffee culture, including venues that keep kettles and/or brewed coffee warm over a stove during service.

== History and terminology ==
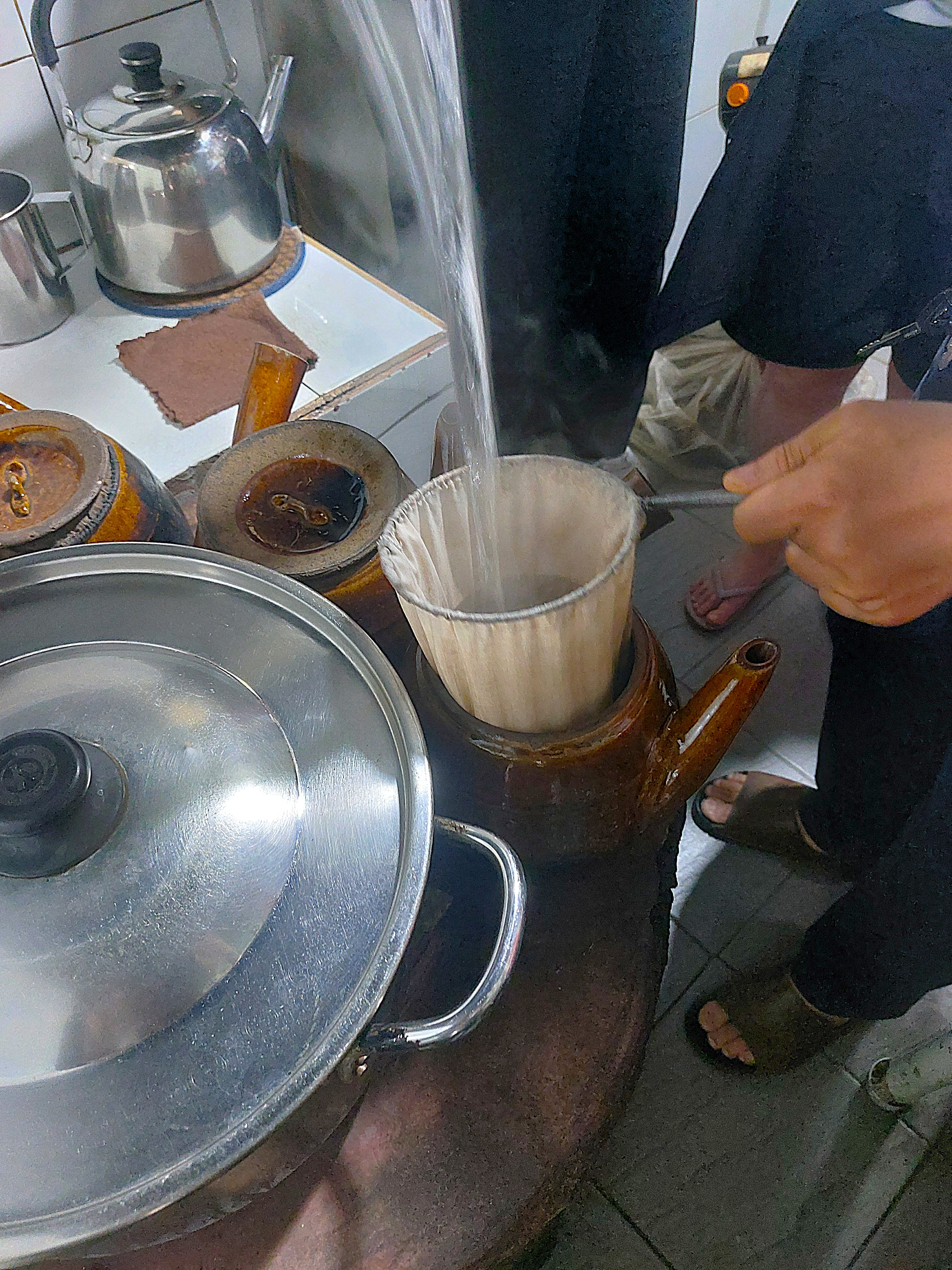
Pouring hot water into the cloth filter.

In Vietnamese, vợt means a net or strainer; in this context it refers to the reusable cloth filter used for brewing, and cà phê vợt refers to coffee prepared with that filter. In English, the method is called "net-filter coffee"; the spoon-shaped cloth filter has been compared to a net used to catch fish in aquarium shops. Vietnamese usage also includes related terms such as cà phê kho and colloquial labels likening the filter to a sock (for example, cà phê bít tất).

The method spread in 20th-century Saigon and is associated with the city's Chinese Vietnamese community, including the Chợ Lớn area, where cloth-filter coffee was sold as a working-class street beverage alongside other brewing styles such as phin coffee. Family-run stalls transmitted cloth-filter techniques through Chinese Vietnamese networks and maintained batch brewing for continuous service in Ho Chi Minh City.

By the mid-20th century, net-filter coffee was associated with inexpensive neighborhood coffeehouses that prepared coffee in batches for a steady flow of customers. Use declined as urban routines changed, espresso-based menus and cafe chains expanded, and single-cup brewing became more common. Interest among younger customers and visitors seeking older Ho Chi Minh City coffee practices has also been reported.

Net-filter coffee is best known as a Ho Chi Minh City specialty, but comparable cloth-filter brewing has also been reported in other Vietnamese cities such as Da Nang. A Ho Chi Minh City net-filter venue was included in a New York Times list of coffee addresses in the city.

== Brewing method ==
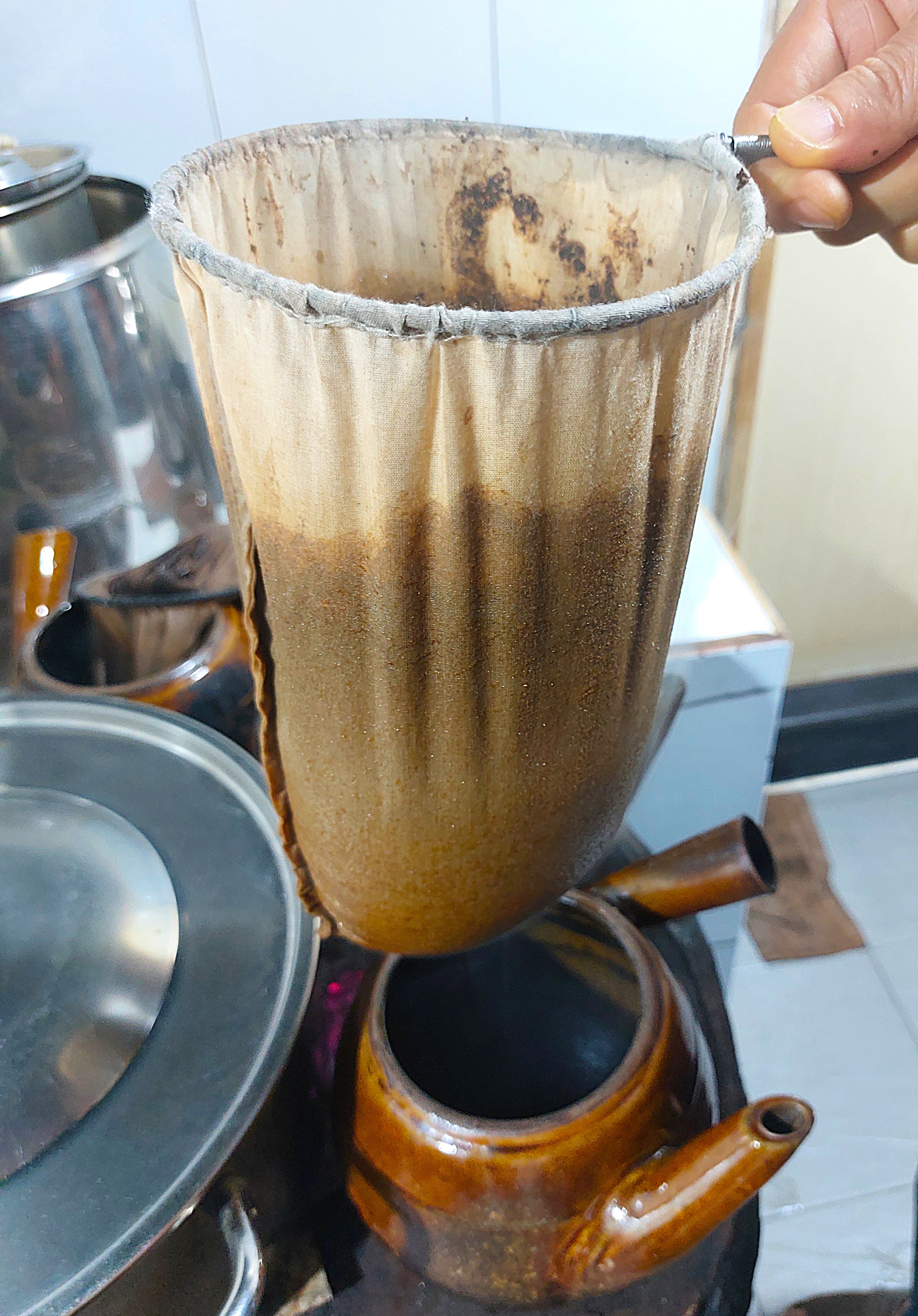
A cloth filter (vợt) used for brewing

Cà phê vợt is prepared as a batch brew. A long reusable cloth filter (held in a metal ring) is positioned over a receiving pot, near-boiling water is poured through the coffee bed in multiple pours, and the finished coffee is transferred to, or maintained in, a holding pot for pour-out service. Batch brewing keeps coffee available during peak hours and supports faster service from a single pot.

Equipment at long-running alley cafes typically includes a cloth filter attached to a metal ring and handle, a kettle for hot water, and a metal, enamel, or earthenware vessel for collecting and holding the brew. Some venues keep water and/or brewed coffee warm over a charcoal stove or similar heat source during service.

A measured dose of ground coffee is placed into the cloth filter and infused with hot water; extraction times and handling vary by venue. Practices may include repeated pours, recirculating the first draw, and heat management to control strength and avoid undesirable flavors. Some venues roast and grind coffee in-house to maintain flavor and strength across batch brews.

== Serving and cultural significance ==
Net-filter coffee may be served black (hot or over ice) or mixed with sweetened condensed milk, including as a milky iced coffee comparable to cà phê sữa đá. Menus at net-filter venues center on traditional orders such as cà phê đen, cà phê sữa, and bạc xỉu, rather than a broad range of espresso-based drinks.

Surviving cà phê vợt vendors in Ho Chi Minh City operate as small-scale alley cafes, market-adjacent stalls, and neighborhood street vendors, with limited seating and service centered on the brewing station.

Research on Vietnam's coffee shop sector treats coffee shops as leisure- and tourism-oriented experiences and examines how customer experience is shaped in coffee shop settings.
