= Lê Phin =

Coffee shop in East Village

- Interactive map of the Lê Phin area

General information
- Location: 259 East 10th Street, New York City, New York, United States
- Coordinates: 40.7285°N 73.9835°W

Lê Phin is a Vietnamese coffee shop in the East Village of Manhattan in New York City. It sells drinks like a traditional Vietnamese iced coffee, as well as a pandan latte.

== History ==
Lê Phin was founded by Kim Lê. She had grown up in Vietnam and "worked as a professional coffee quality grader." She decided to found a coffee shop in America after graduating from grad school in 2015, returning to Vietnam, and visiting a relative's coffee farm in Bảo Lộc.

== Critical reception ==
The Infatuation named Lê Phin to a list of 15 "Great Asian-Owned Coffee And Tea Shops In NYC."
