= Șodou =

Culinary preparation from Romania

Șodou is a culinary preparation from Romania. It looks like a sabayon. The șodou is traditionally obtained by incorporating honey with raw egg yolks together with milk (vanilla extract or condiments like cinnamon or nutmeg can also be added). The egg yolks are beaten along with the honey using a fork until it is slightly fluffy, then warm milk is added gradually while stirring the mixture. The șodou is served immediately after preparation, and is drunk fast by taking small sips. The șodou is intended to help with sore throats, as it is believed to be a natural remedy that has been passed on by generations.

The term șodou comes from the French chaudeau, or "hot water".
