= Vietnam National Coffee Corporation =

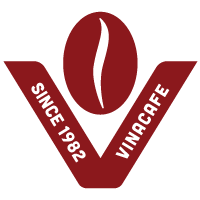
- Native name: Tổng công ty Cà phê Việt Nam
- Type: state-owned enterprises
- Industry: Coffee growing, coffee production, and coffee beverages
- Founded: 1995
- Headquarters: Ho Chi Minh City, Vietnam
- Key people: Nguyễn Văn Hà; Nguyễn Nam Hải
- Products: Green coffee, roasted and ground coffee, milk coffee, instant coffee, sugar, black pepper, various fertilizers...
- Total assets: 525 billion Vietnamese Dong (2008)
- Parent: Vietnamese government
- Subsidiaries: vinacafe
- Website: www.vinacafe.com.vn

Vietnam National Coffee Corporation (Vietnamese: Tổng công ty Cà phê Việt Nam) was established on April 29, 1995, in accordance with Decision No. 251/TTg of the Prime Minister of Vietnam. Its organizational and operating charter was approved by Decision No. 04/2008/QD-TTg signed by the Prime Minister on January 9, 2008. The company is a state-owned enterprise with branches in 15 provinces and cities in Vietnam and one branch in Laos. Its domestic business is mainly concentrated in the Central Highlands region. Over the years, the company has made contributions to the socio-economic development of the region. It is also a leading supplier of green coffee beans in Vietnam, accounting for 30% of Vietnam's green coffee bean export market share. The company has also established VINACAFE trade and service centers in major coffee producing and consuming areas and major cities in Vietnam to promote trade and promote its brand.
