= Vinacafe =

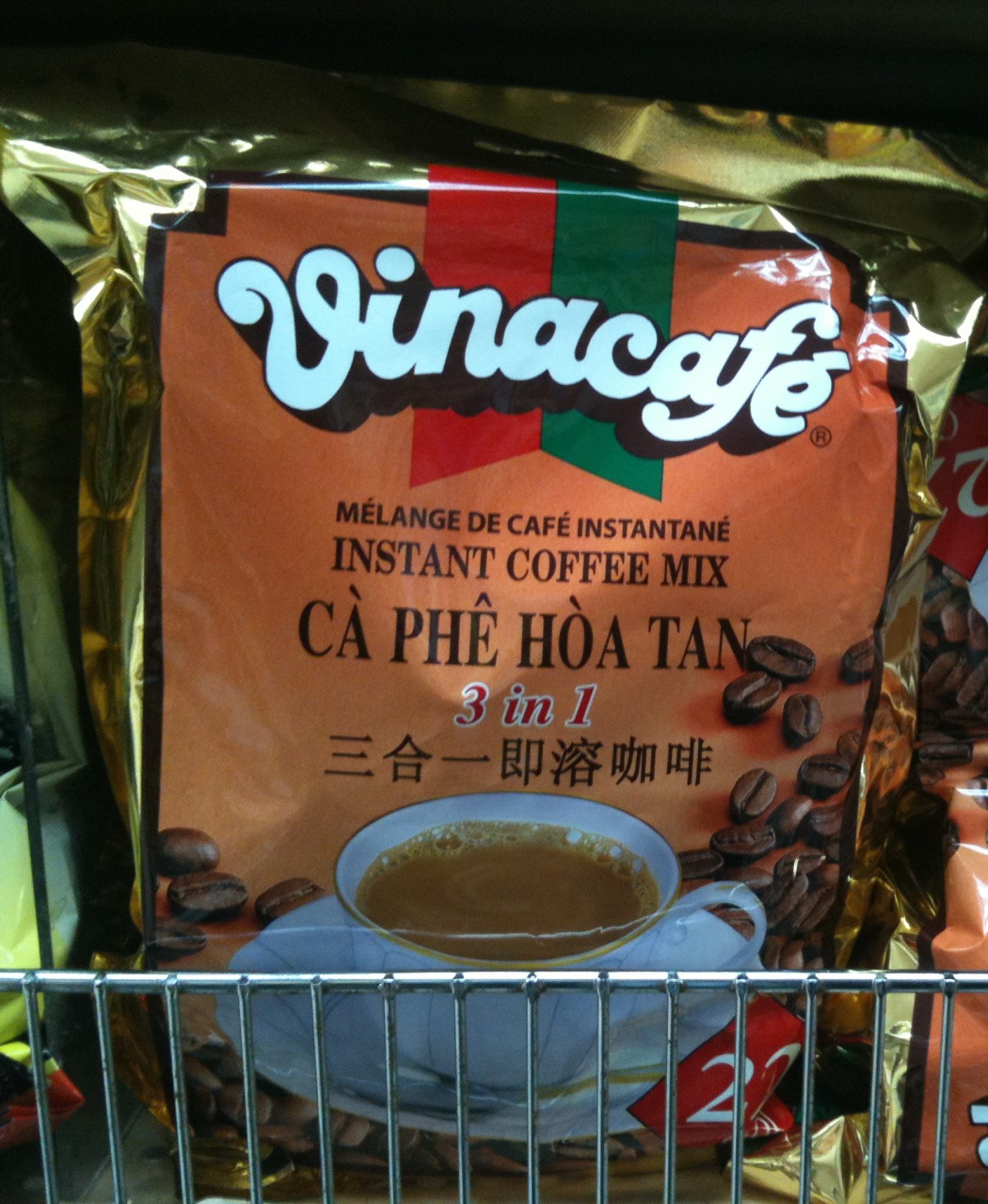
A bag of Vinacafé 3-in-1 instant coffee.

Vinacafe (or Vinacafé Bien Hoa JSC) is a Vietnamese company involved in the production, processing and distribution of coffee and instant cereal mix. It is an affiliate of the Vietnam National Coffee Corporation (abbreviated "Vinacafe"), a Hanoi-based, state-owned corporation under the Ministry of Agriculture and the Food Industry, which deals in the production, processing, export, and import of coffee. Established in 1969 at the Coronel Coffee Plant in Biên Hòa, Đồng Nai Province, Republic of Vietnam by French engineer Marcel Coronel, the company was confiscated by the state when Coronel and his family fled Vietnam at the close of the Vietnam War. The plant successfully processed its first batches of instant coffee in 1977. The Vinacafé brand was established in 1983, and the company became a joint stock company in December 2004. Its coffee products have been awarded the title of "Highest Quality Vietnamese Product" since 1995. The company's director is Mr. Phạm Quang Vũ.

== History ==
The Coronel Coffee Plant was established in 1969 by French engineer Marcel Coronel, with the aim of providing inexpensive coffee for export to France. When Coronel left Vietnam in 1975, the Viet Cong took over management of the plant. Two years later, in 1977, the plant successfully processed its first batches of instant coffee. Vietnam's entry into Comecon in 1978 allowed Vinacafé to begin exporting coffee to the Soviet Union and other Soviet Bloc states. The Vinacafé brand was established in 1983. After the disbanding of Comecon in 1991, Vinacafé's focus returned to the domestic market, and new export markets were explored. Vinacafé's successful "3-in-1" line of instant coffee was introduced in 1993, and has been registered in 60 countries worldwide. In 1995, the Vietnam National Coffee Corporation was created by government decree, grouping together a large number of smaller corporations—including the Bien Hoa Coffee plant and around 49 other coffee plantations. Based in Hanoi, this state-owned parent corporation operates under the Ministry of Agriculture and the Food Industry, dealing in the production, processing, export, and import of coffee, as well as many other products related to agriculture such as food and industrial crops, seafood, machine parts, and so on. Vinacafé Bien Hoa became a joint stock company in December 2004. As of 2005, Vinacafe's share of the domestic instant coffee market was 50%, edging out Nestlé's share of 33%.

== Products ==
The company is mainly known for its Vinacafé brand of coffee products, including both ground coffee suitable for filters and instant coffee. Vinacafé's "3-in-1" line of instant coffee, which approximates the taste of Vietnamese cà phê sữa by combining coffee with non-dairy creamer and sugar in a single packet, has been quite successful in both domestic and international markets. "3-in-1" is a registered brand in 60 countries throughout the world. Its coffee products have been awarded the title of "Highest Quality Vietnamese Product" since 1995.

== Production and facilities ==
The original Coronel Coffee Plant in Biên Hòa, Đồng Nai Province, was designed for an output of 80 tons of instant coffee per year. To meet growing domestic and international demand, a second processing plant was built, coming into operation in 2000. This second plant has a designed capacity of 800 tons of instant coffee per year. A third processing plant, based in the town of Long Thanh, Đồng Nai Province is expected to begin operation in 2012. This new plant, with an expected output of 3,200 tons of instant coffee per year, followed an investment of US$26 million; up to 70% of the production will go for export.

== Notes and references ==
Bibliography

- Government of Vietnam (1995-04-29). "On the Establishment of the Vietnam National Coffee Corporation". AsianLII.
- Government of Vietnam (1995-07-15). "Decree No.44-CP of July 15, 1995 of the Government Ratifying the Statute on the Organization and Operation of the Vietnam National Coffee Corporation". Dong Nai Provincial People's Committee. Archived from the original on 2011-07-23.
