= Egg coffee =

Vietnamese drink

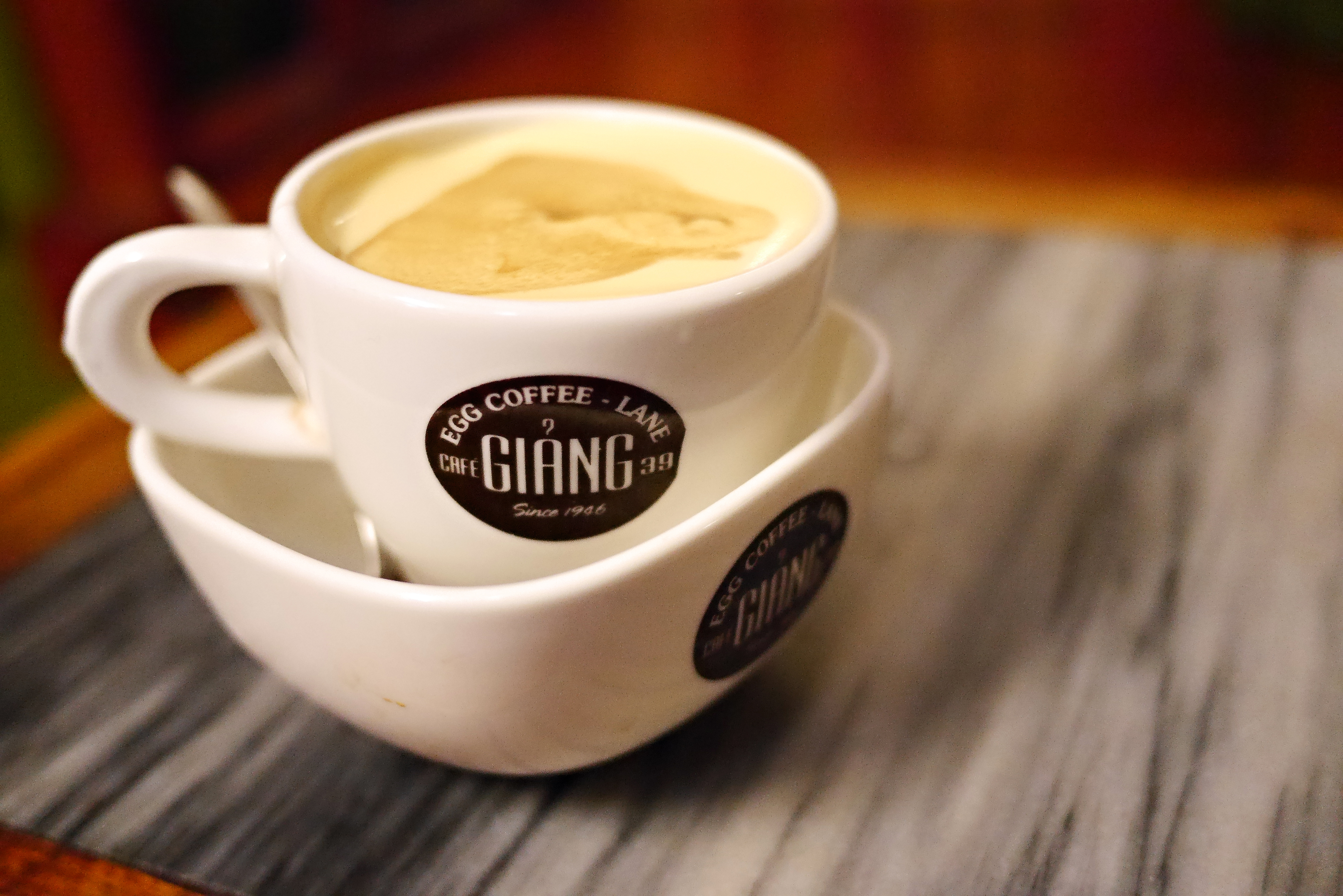
- Alternative names: Vietnamese: Cà phê trứng
- Type: Beverage
- Place of origin: Vietnam
- Region or state: Hanoi
- Main ingredients: eggs, sugar, milk, and coffee

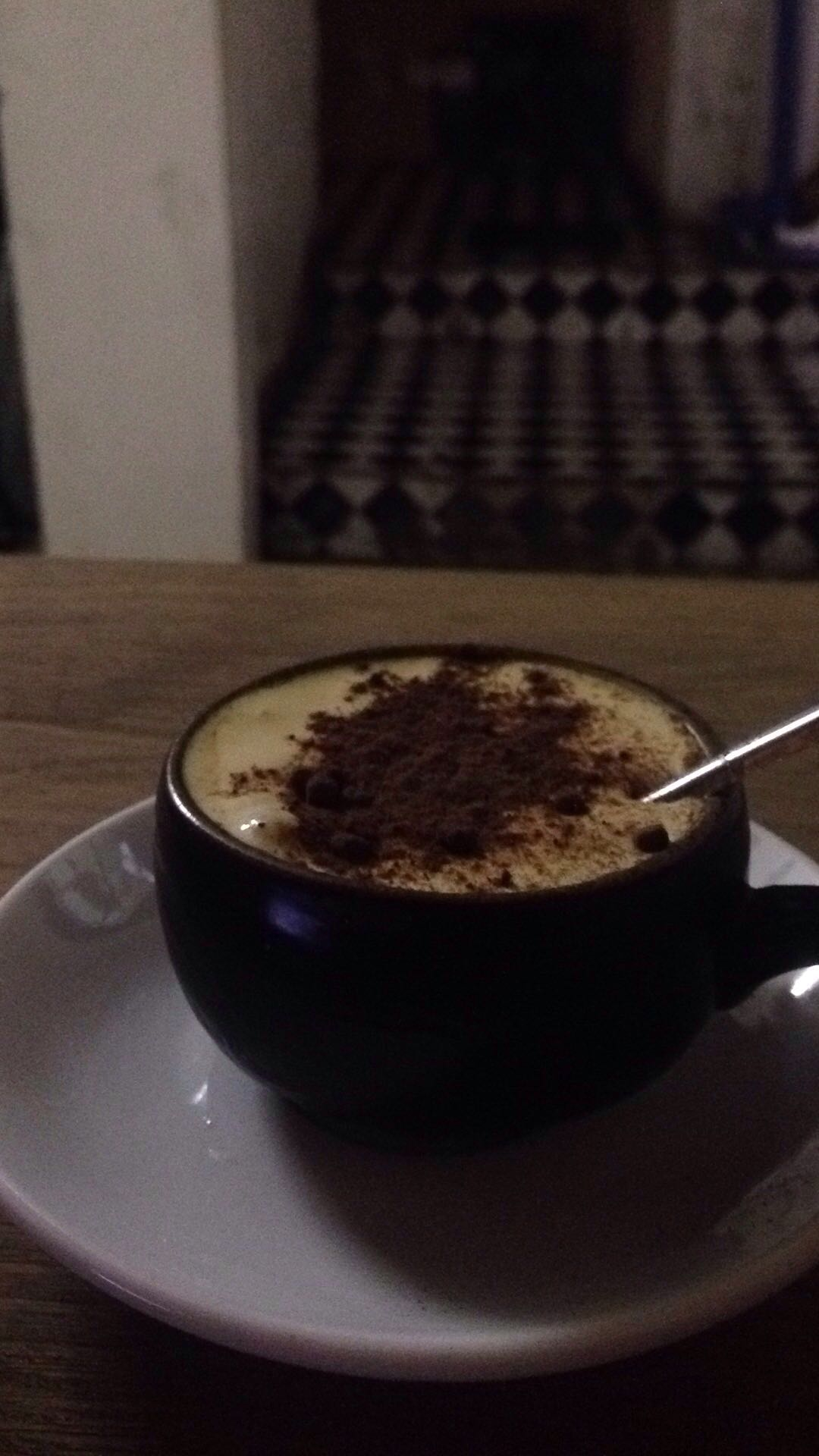
Egg coffee in Hanoi

Egg coffee (Vietnamese: Cà phê trứng, (Vietnamese: [kà fe ʈ͡ʂɯ̌ŋ])) is a Vietnamese drink traditionally prepared with egg yolks, sugar, condensed milk and robusta coffee. The drink is made by filtering coffee beans in a phin, and beating egg yolks with sugar and condensed milk over heat to get egg-cream component.

The drink is served in cafes throughout Vietnam, originating in Hanoi. The Giang Café (Vietnamese: Cà Phê Giảng) in Hanoi is known for serving the drink, which it makes with egg yolk, coffee powder, condensed milk, and, optionally, cheese. The cup is sometimes served inside a bowl of hot water or set upon a small candle to retain its temperature. The son of the café's founder Nguyen Giang claims that his father developed the recipe for the drink when milk was scarce in Vietnam in the late 1940s, replacing milk with egg yolk.

== Ingredients and preparation ==
Ingredients for making egg coffee include fresh chicken eggs, sugar, condensed milk, and coffee. The egg yolks are whipped with condensed milk and sugar and then gently heated via a water bath, as direct boiling would cause the eggs to curdle. The lipids in the yolk emulsify with the coffee, neutralizing the bitter tannins of the Robusta bean to form a thick, aromatic foam. A teaspoon is provided in order to eat the foam before drinking the coffee at the bottom. Egg coffee is served in a small cup. To keep the drink warm, the waiter puts a cup of coffee in a bowl of warm water. After being poured over the egg cream the coffee at the bottom of the cup acquires a richer taste.

In the past, eggs were hand beaten which takes time for the foam to be whipped. With the availability of electric mixers, the coffee can be combined together with cocoa, white beans and matcha (tea powder) to create more variants. It can be served either hot or iced.

== Non-Vietnamese "egg coffees" ==
Uovo sbattuto con caffè is a common Italian breakfast item, coffee added to beaten sugar and egg yolk. There are other, different, recipes for coffee containing egg.

- Swedish egg coffee is an American drink (despite its name) made by mixing ground coffee beans with an egg and simmering, like cowboy coffee; the egg makes the grounds sink, leaving smooth coffee.
- Egg brandy coffee from Sri Lanka
- Cuban egg coffee, known locally as "café a la criolla", is made by mixing hot espresso coffee with the yolk of a raw egg, sugar and white rum.
- Kopi telur from Indonesia

== Gallery ==
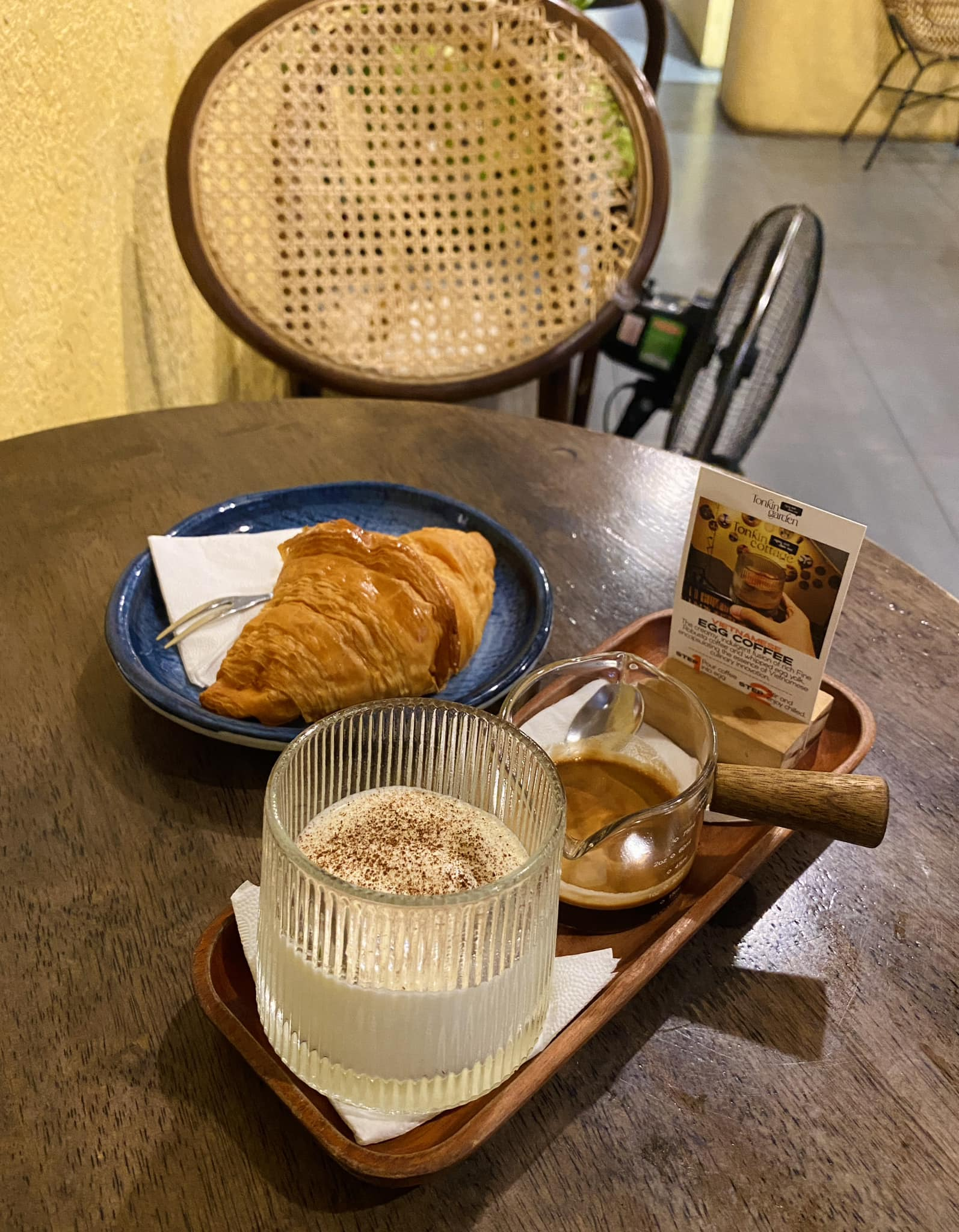

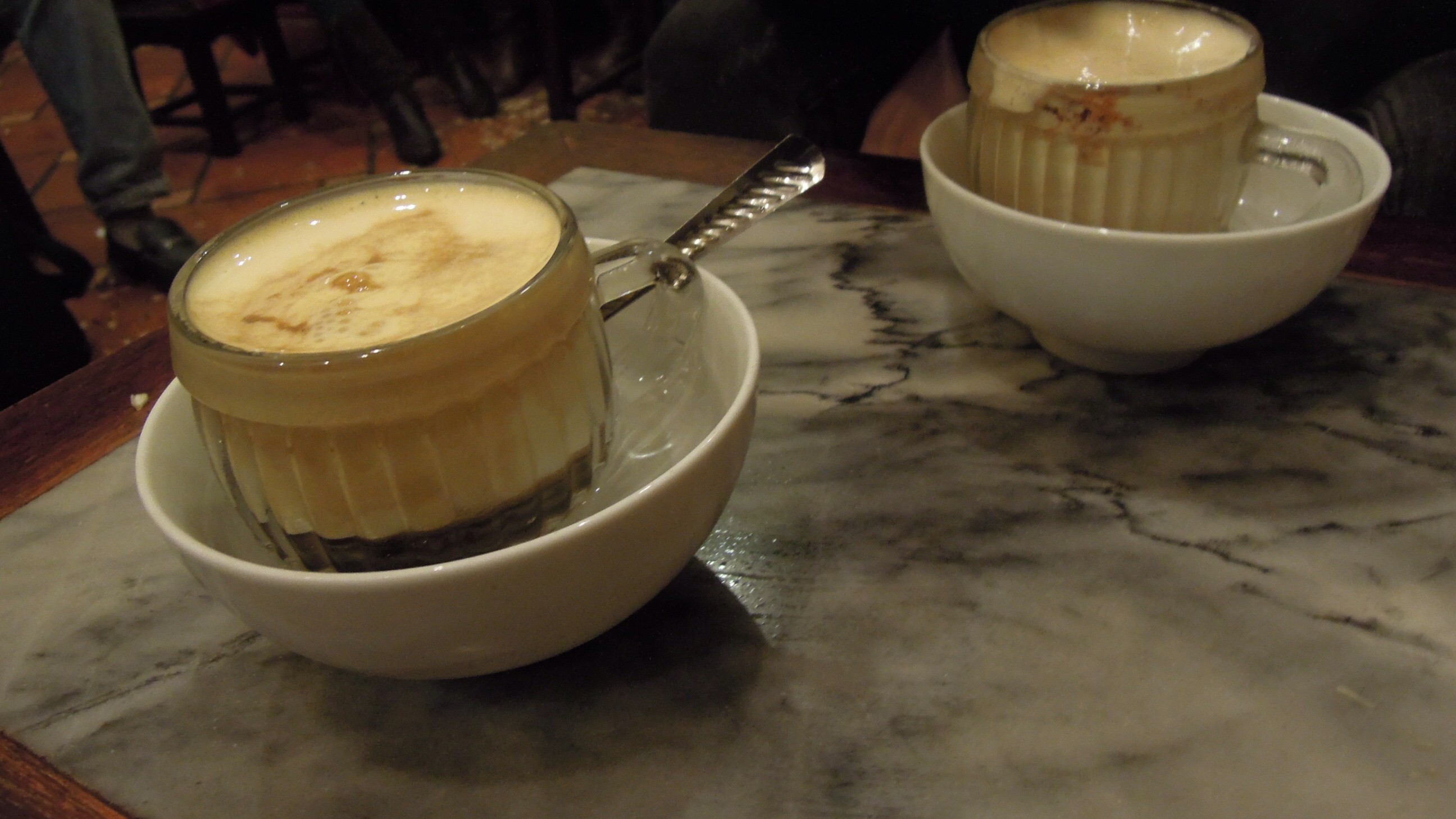

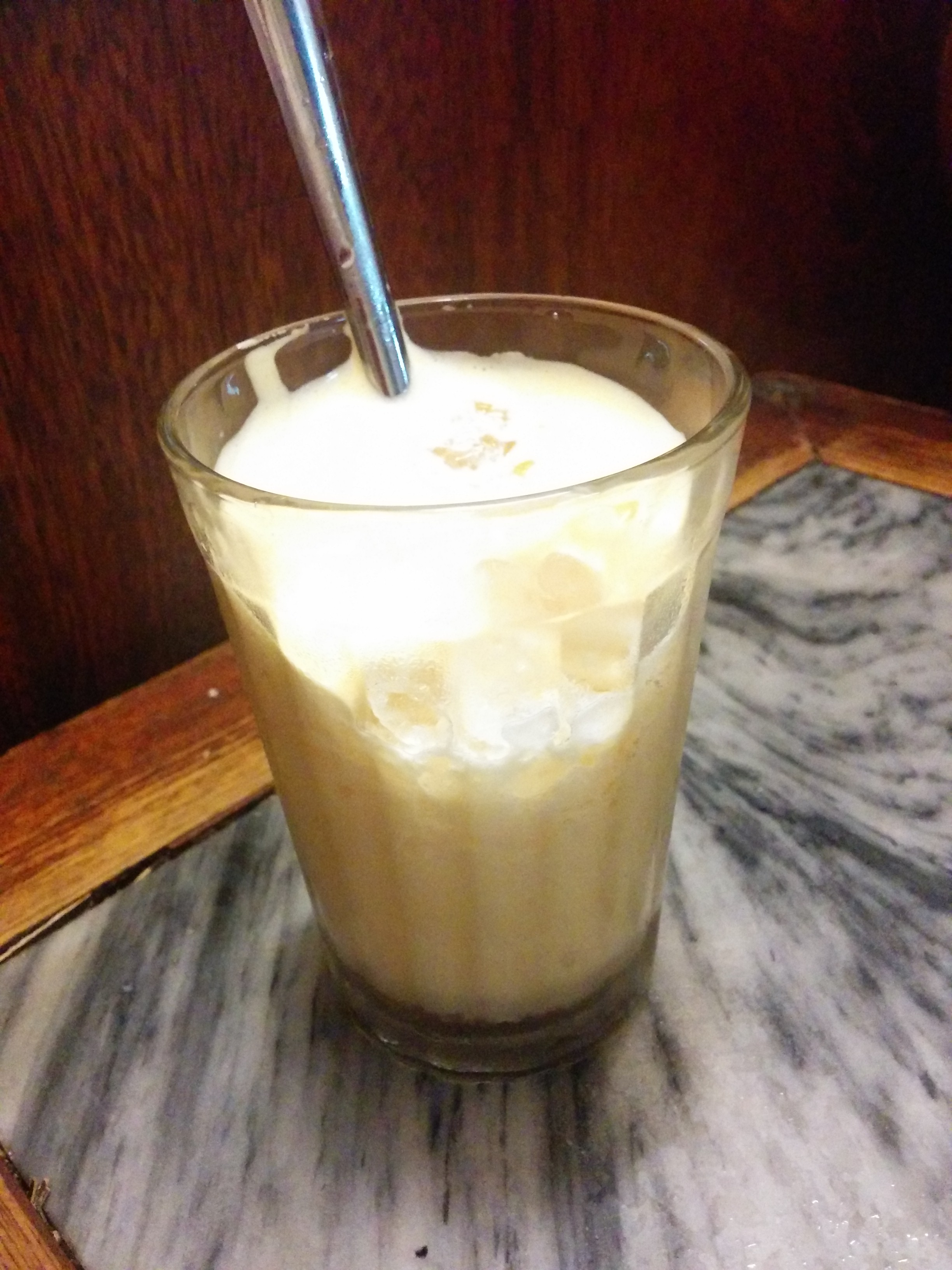

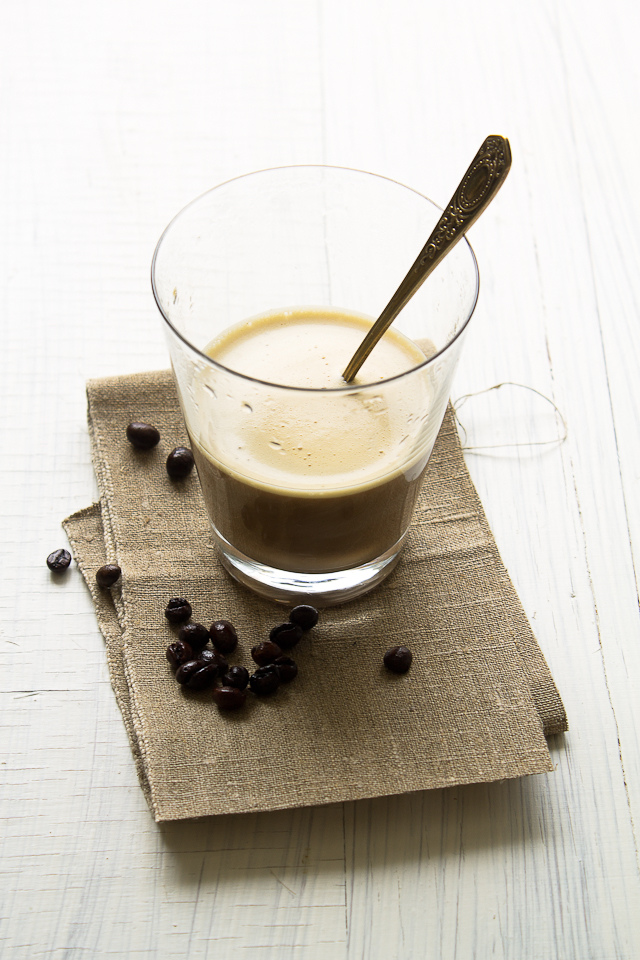

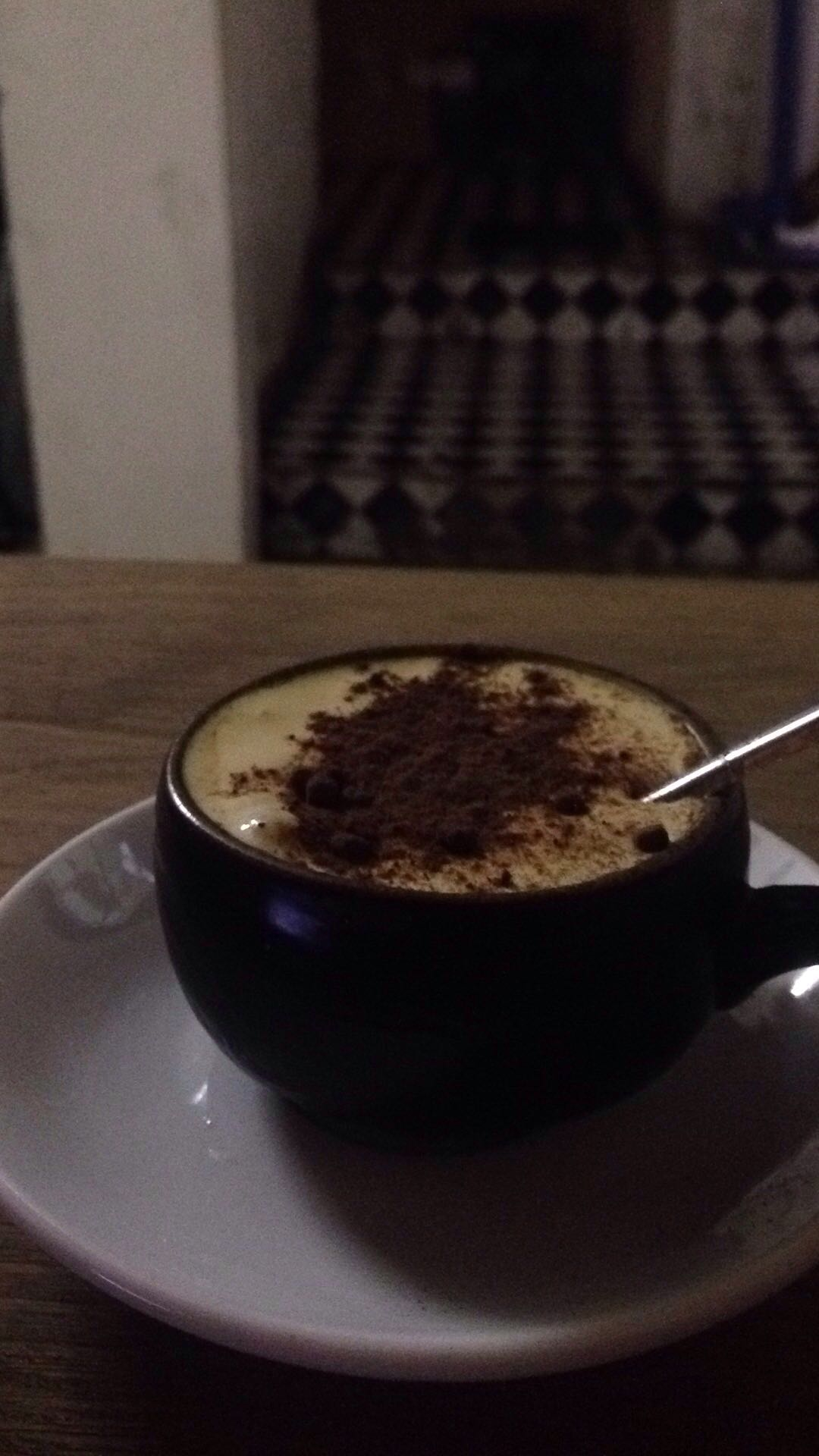

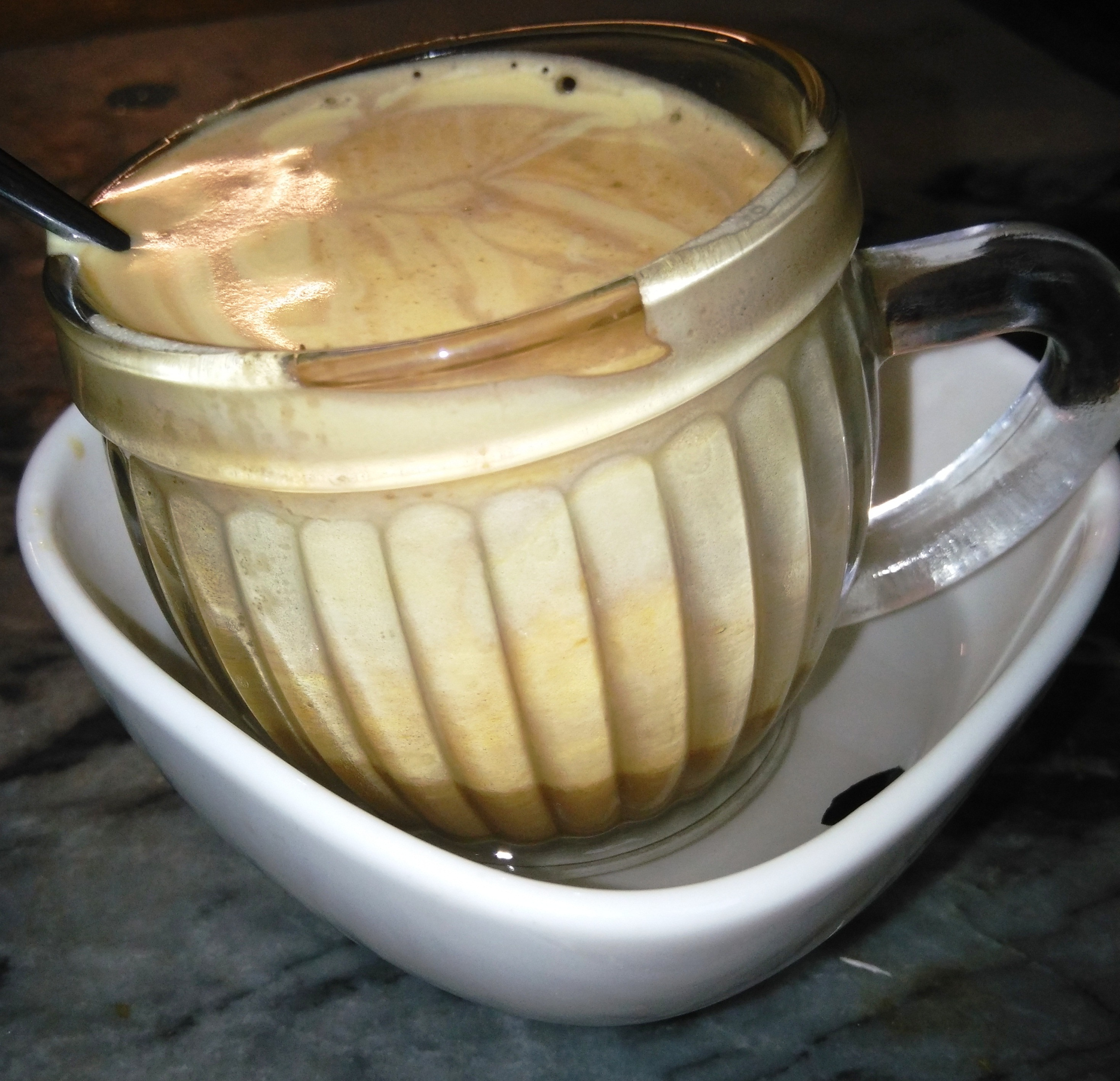

== See also ==
- List of coffee drinks
- Uovo sbattuto
