= Uovo sbattuto =

Italian breakfast

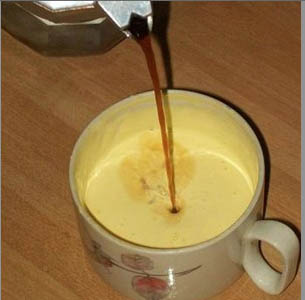
Uovo sbattuto al caffè is a rustic Italian tradition.

Uovo sbattuto (lit. 'beaten egg') is an Italian breakfast item. Similar to zabaione, uovo sbattuto consists of egg yolk and sugar, ingredients readily available in most villages and farms.

In older times, it was considered an easy way to consume a quick and economical breakfast. Often espresso and milk can be added to make uovo sbattuto al caffè. This is usually eaten with crusty or toasted bread. When made for children, caffè d'orzo (a caffeine-free grain drink) can be substituted for the espresso.

== See also ==
- Espresso
- Zabaione
