= Zabaione =

Italian dessert, or sometimes drink

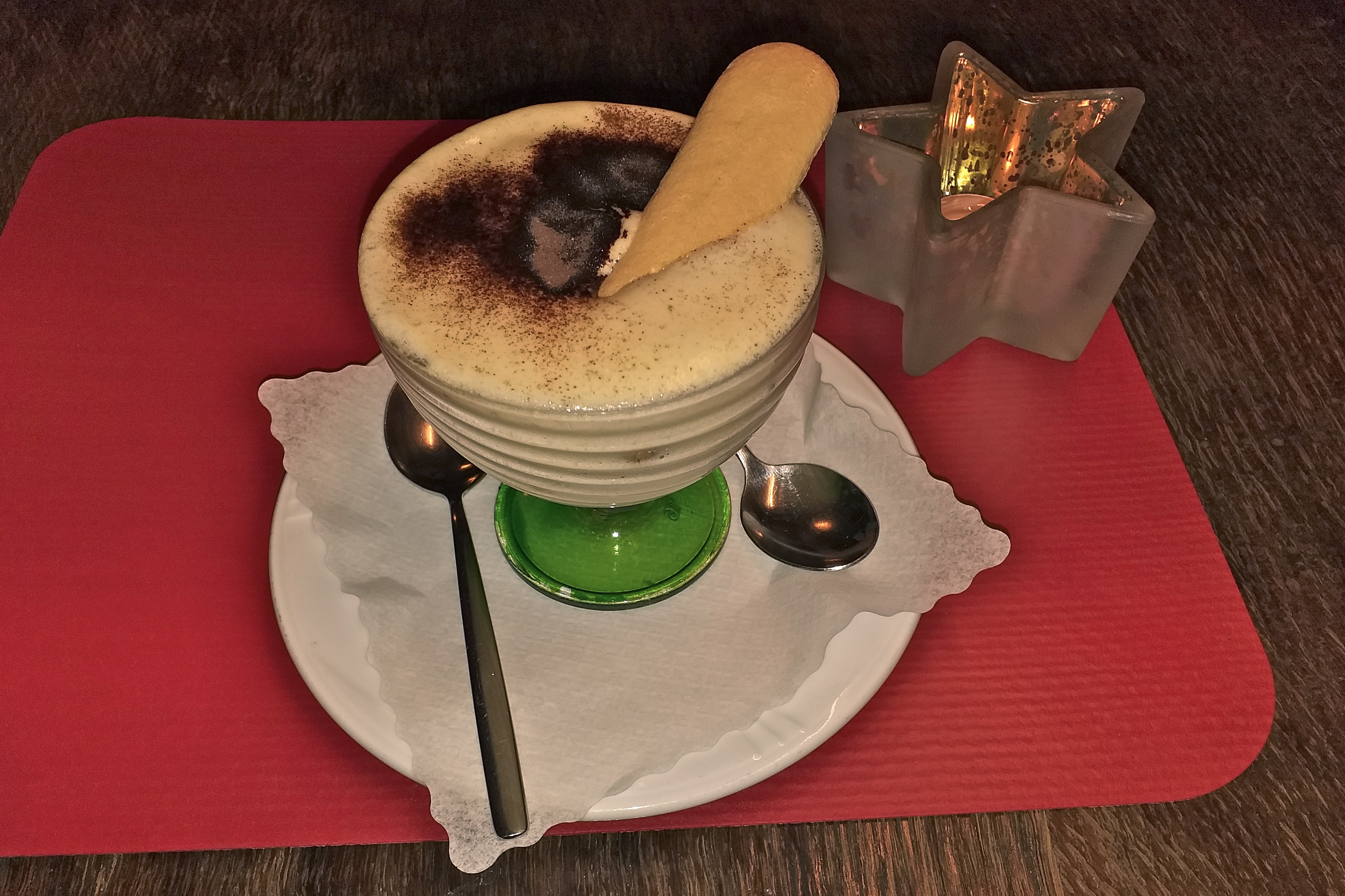
- A glass of zabaione
- Alternative names: Zabaglione, sambajon (in Piedmontese)
- Course: Dessert
- Place of origin: Italy
- Region or state: Piedmont
- Main ingredients: Egg yolks, sugar, a sweet wine

Zabaione (Italian: [dzabaˈjoːne]) or zabaglione (UK: /ˌzæbəlˈjoʊni/, US: /ˌzɑːb-/; Italian: [dzabaʎˈʎoːne]), (Note: Another spelling, considered archaic, is zabajone.) is an Italian dessert, or sometimes a drink, made with egg yolks, sugar, and a sweet wine (usually Moscato d'Asti). Some versions of the recipe incorporate spirits such as cognac. The dessert version is a light custard, whipped to incorporate a large amount of air. Since the 1960s, in restaurants in areas of the US with large Italian populations, zabaione is usually served with strawberries, blueberries, peaches, etc., in a champagne coupe, and is often prepared tableside for dramatic effect.

In France, it is called sabayon. The dessert is popular in Argentina and Uruguay, where it is known as sambayón (from the Piedmontese sambajon) and is a popular ice cream flavour.

== History ==
Although accounts vary, the Italian dessert dates as far back as the second half of the 15th century, a recipe for which appears in the manuscript collection at the Morgan Library Cuoco Napoletano.

== Preparation ==
Classic zabaione uses raw egg yolks cooked in a bain-marie and most often served with Marsala wine (although other wines can be substituted). It can be finished with beaten egg white (meringue) or sometimes with whipped cream.

Occasionally, the wine is omitted when the dish is served to children or those who abstain from alcohol. It is then, in effect, a very different dessert. A simple version of zabaione is called uovo sbattuto and is mostly considered a breakfast item, especially when flavoured with espresso.

== In French cuisine ==
The French adopted the recipe as part of their system of sauces in the 1800s as a dessert cream called sabayon. By the 20th century, the name sabayon was also used to describe savoury broths and yolk-based sauces.

== See also ==
- List of Italian desserts and pastries
- Uovo sbattuto
