= Vietnamese iced coffee =

Coffee with sweetened condensed milk and ice

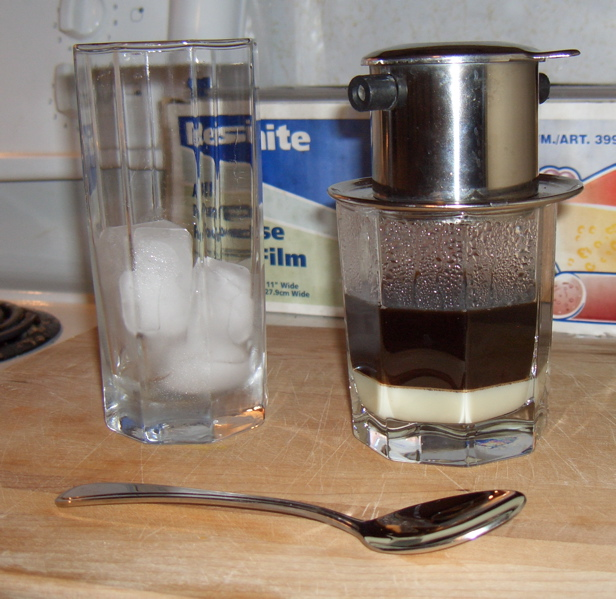
- Cà phê sữa đá ready to be stirred and poured over ice
- Alternative names: Cà phê sữa đá Cà phê nâu đá
- Type: Beverage
- Place of origin: Vietnam
- Region or state: Southeast Asia
- Serving temperature: Cold
- Main ingredients: Dark-roast robusta coffee grounds, water, sweetened condensed milk, and ice

Vietnamese iced coffee (Southern Vietnamese: cà phê sữa đá, lit. 'iced milk coffee'; Northern Vietnamese: cà phê nâu đá, lit. 'iced brown coffee') is a Vietnamese beverage made by pouring hot water through a traditional metal filter, called a phin, containing dark-roast robusta coffee grounds, into a small cup with sweetened condensed milk already in it. The contents of the cup are then stirred together and poured into a tall glass full of ice.

== Origin ==
Vietnamese iced coffee has its origins in French colonialism and is believed to be an adaptation of café au lait (coffee with milk). Due to the scarcity of fresh milk, as the dairy farming industry in Vietnam was still in its infancy at the time, and the fact that fresh milk would spoil rather quickly in the tropical heat, the French and Vietnamese were forced to use the only reasonable substitute they had on hand, which was imported, shelf-stable sweetened condensed milk.

Dark-roast robusta coffee was discovered to pair best with the condensed milk. When compared to traditionally-favored medium-roast Arabica, dark-roast robusta has a greater level of bitterness due to both its darker roast and the fact that it has nearly double the amount of caffeine, which is an inherently bitter compound. It was found that the higher degree of bitterness from this specific roast and coffee variety could offset the condensed milk’s sweetness, an undesired quality since the goal was to create a drink that tasted like café au lait, which is not sweet.

One last deviation from café au lait was the addition of ice to this beverage, a response to Vietnam’s hot tropical climate.

== Variations ==
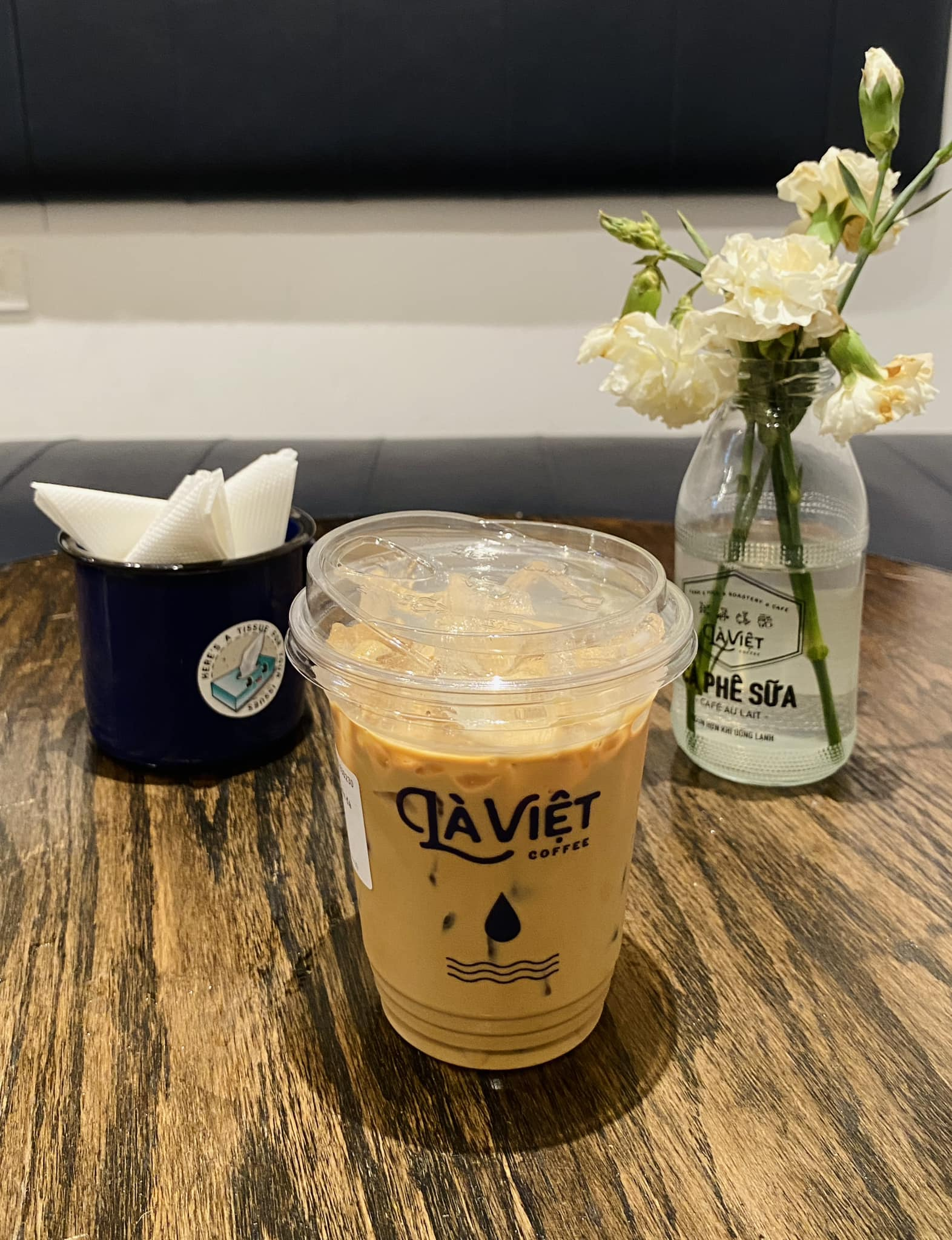
Cà phê sữa đá ready to serve

Other Vietnamese coffees include:

- Black coffee (Cà phê đen) – Strong plain black coffee served hot (cà phê đen nóng) or iced (cà phê đen đá).
- White coffee/Saigon-style coffee (Bạc xỉu) – A mixture of condensed milk and fresh milk with a splash of coffee. Similar to a latte macchiato. Originated during the 1950s within the Cantonese-Vietnamese community in the Chợ Lớn quarter of Saigon. The original Cantonese name for this drink was "baahk dái síu fèh" (Chinese: 白底小啡, lit. 'A cup of white milk with a little coffee'), which was then transliterated into Vietnamese as "bạc tẩy xỉu phé" before being shortened to "bạc xỉu".
- Egg coffee (Cà phê trứng) – Coffee topped with a custard foam made from whipped chicken egg yolks and condensed milk. Similar in taste to tiramisu. Created in 1946 by Nguyễn Văn Giảng of Cà Phê Giảng located in Hanoi in response to wartime dairy shortages.
- Salt coffee (Cà phê muối) – Coffee and condensed milk with salted cream foam on top. The salt enhances the sweetness of the condensed milk, similar to how adding a pinch of salt to caramel intensifies the caramel flavors. Created in 2010 by Hồ Thị Thanh Hương and Trần Nguyễn Hữu Phong of Cà Phê Muối located in Huế.
- Yogurt coffee (Cà phê sữa chua) – Coffee and condensed milk atop yogurt with some added ice. Created in 2012 by Phạm Duy Trí of Cà Phê Duy Trí located in Hanoi.
- Coconut coffee (Cà phê cốt dừa) – Coffee mixed with a slushy made from condensed milk, coconut cream (or coconut milk) and ice. Originated in Hanoi, with Cộng Cà Phê credited for popularizing the drink.
- Avocado coffee (Cà phê bơ) – Coffee added over top of a smoothie made from condensed milk, fresh milk, avocado, and ice. Originated in Đắk Lắk, where both coffee and avocado are cultivated, naturally leading to the combination of the two.
- Pandan coffee (Cà phê lá dứa) – Coffee layered over a mixture of condensed milk, fresh milk, pandan and ice.
- Coffee shake (Sinh tố cà phê) – Coffee, condensed milk, vanilla ice cream and ice, blended together until smooth.

All Vietnamese coffee variations share three common attributes: (1) Vietnamese-grown robusta coffee beans, (2) preparation using a phin filter, and (3) if creamer is called for, the addition of sweetened condensed milk.

== See also ==
- Coffee production in Vietnam
- Cuban espresso, similar sweetened coffee.
- Indian filter coffee, similarly produced (drip from a metal filter) coffee.
- List of coffee beverages
