= Pelican (Fabergé egg) =

1898 Imperial Fabergé egg

Imperial Pelican Fabergé egg
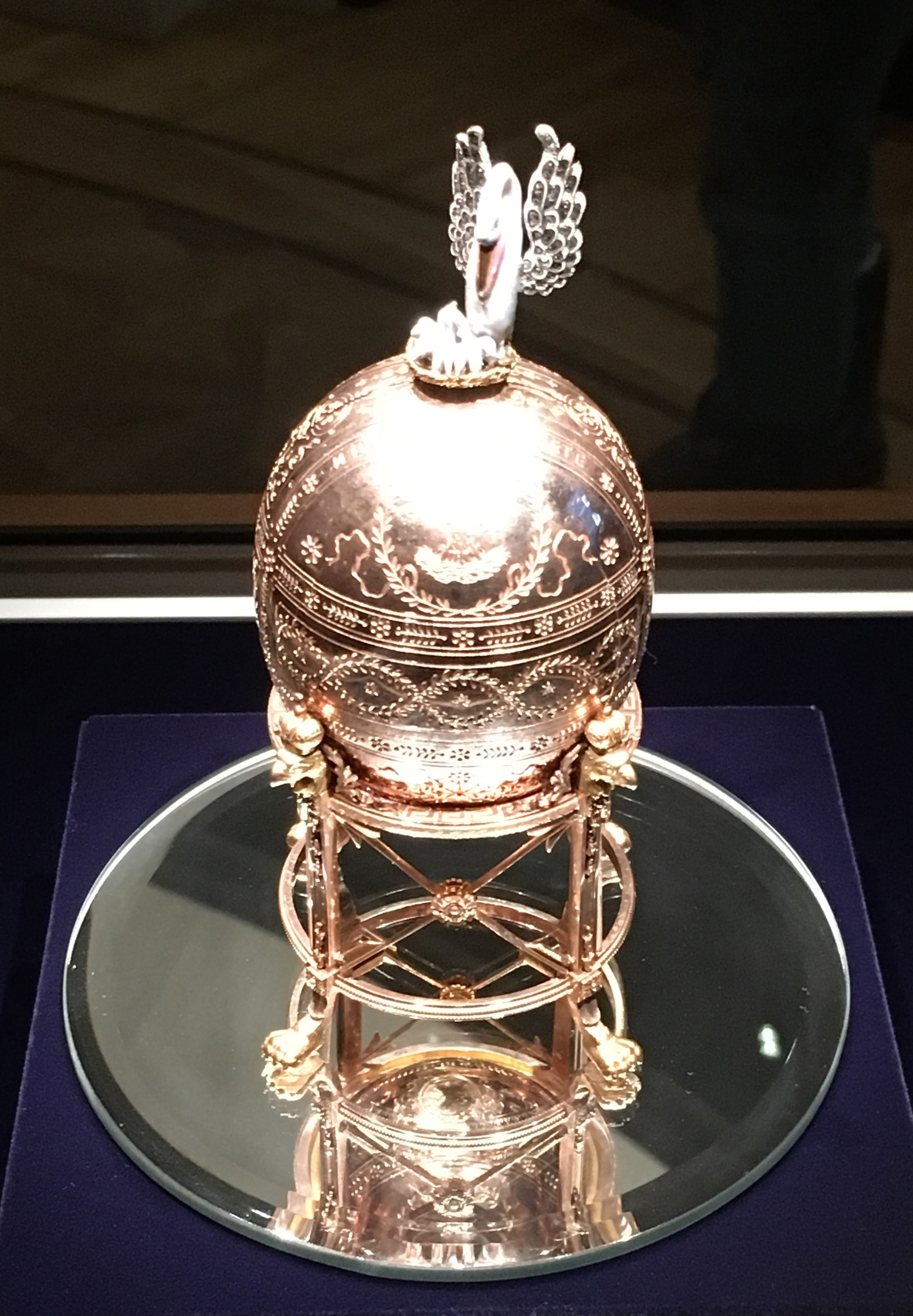
- The egg on its original stand also in the Empire style
- Year delivered: 1898
- Customer: Nicholas II
- Recipient: Maria Feodorovna

Current owner
- Individual or institution: Virginia Museum of Fine Arts
- Year of acquisition: 1947

Design and materials
- Workmaster: Michael Perkhin
- Materials used: Gold, diamond, enamel
- Height: 102 millimetres (4.0 in)
- Surprise: Eight framed miniature watercolors

The Dowager (or Imperial Pelican) Fabergé egg, is a jewelled Easter egg made under the supervision of the Russian jeweller Peter Carl Fabergé in 1898. The egg was made for Nicholas II of Russia, who presented it to his mother, the Dowager Empress Maria Feodorovna on Easter 1898.

== Design ==
The egg was created by Faberge's workmaster, Mikhail Evlampievich Perkhin (Russian, 1860–1903) with miniatures by Johannes Zehngraf (Danish, 1857–1908) and is made of red gold, diamonds, pearls, gray, pink and opalescent blue enamel and watercolor on ivory. The stand is made of varicolored gold and the egg itself unfolds into a screen of eight ivory miniatures.

The egg is one of the few Faberge eggs that is not enameled over most of its surface. It is made of engraved red gold in the Empire style, surmounted by a pelican in opalescent gray, blue and pink enamel. The pelican is feeding her young in the nest, a symbol of maternal care. The egg is engraved with classical motifs, the commemorative dates 1797–1897, and the inscription "Visit our vineyards, O Lord, and we shall dwell in thee."

The egg is supported on a varicolored gold, four-legged stand and retains its original red velvet case, the only time this color was used for a Tsar Imperial Easter Egg-case.

== Surprise ==
The egg contains eight oval miniature paintings of charitable institutions patronized by the Dowager Empress: the Kseniinsky Institute, the Nikolai Orphanage, the Patriotic Institute, the Smolny Institute, the Ekaterina Institute, the Pavel Institute, the St. Petersburg Orphanage of Nikolai, and the Elizabeth Institute. The institutions, founded mainly for the education of the daughters of the nobility, are depicted on an extending folding screen of eight ivory panels, each within a pearl border. The miniatures are painted by court miniaturist Johannes Zehngraf. On the back of each is written the name of the institution portrayed. The ninth "panel" is a stand for the other eight.

== History ==
Because of the dates "1797 and 1897" on the Egg, for many years the Pelican Egg was ascribed to 1897, but when the original Fabergé invoice was found it showed that this Egg was presented to Maria Feodorovna for Easter 1898.

In 1930, the Imperial Pelican Fabergé egg, with the eight oval miniatures, was one of ten Imperial eggs sold by the Antikvariat to Armand Hammer in New York City. Hammer showed the egg along with other Russian treasures at department stores all across the United States. Between 1936 and 1938 it was purchased by Lillian Thomas Pratt, the wife of John Lee Pratt, from Hammer Galleries. Mrs. Pratt willed the Egg to the Virginia Museum of Fine Arts in Richmond, Virginia, upon her death in 1947. It remains on view as part of the Virginia Museum of Fine Art's European Decorative Art collection.

== Alterations ==
The position of the pelican (and nest with chicks) at the egg's top has been changed, as seen by comparing historical photos of the piece when still in Russia. It has been turned 90 degrees from its original position, an alteration which seems to have been made in the 1930s in the US, when the artwork was sold to the well-known Fabergé/Fauxbergé dealer Armand Hammer. A 1939 photo from Hammer's exhibition catalogue Фаберже Fabergé his Works already shows the pelican's wrong position. Same as in a previous photo taken (along with 9 other Imperial eggs) on 22 November 1937, the opening date of another exhibition by Hammer.

Originally, when the egg was unfolded, the front of the symbolic pelican (not the side as at present) was seen on the flat piece of metal used as a stand to prop the rest of the spread-out egg up.

== Sources ==
- Faber, Toby (2008). Faberge's Eggs: The Extraordinary Story of the Masterpieces That Outlived an Empire. Random House. ISBN 978-1-4000-6550-9.
- Forbes, Christopher; Prinz von Hohenzollern, Johann Georg (1990). FABERGE; The Imperial Eggs. Prestel. ASIN B000YA9GOM.
- Lowes, Will (2001). Fabergé Eggs: A Retrospective Encyclopedia. Scarecrow Press. ISBN 0-8108-3946-6.
- Snowman, A Kenneth (1988). Carl Faberge: Goldsmith to the Imperial Court of Russia. Gramercy. ISBN 0-517-40502-4.
