= Red Cross with Triptych (Fabergé egg) =

1915 Imperial Fabergé egg

Coordinates: 41.5089°N 81.6117°W

Red Cross with Triptych Fabergé egg
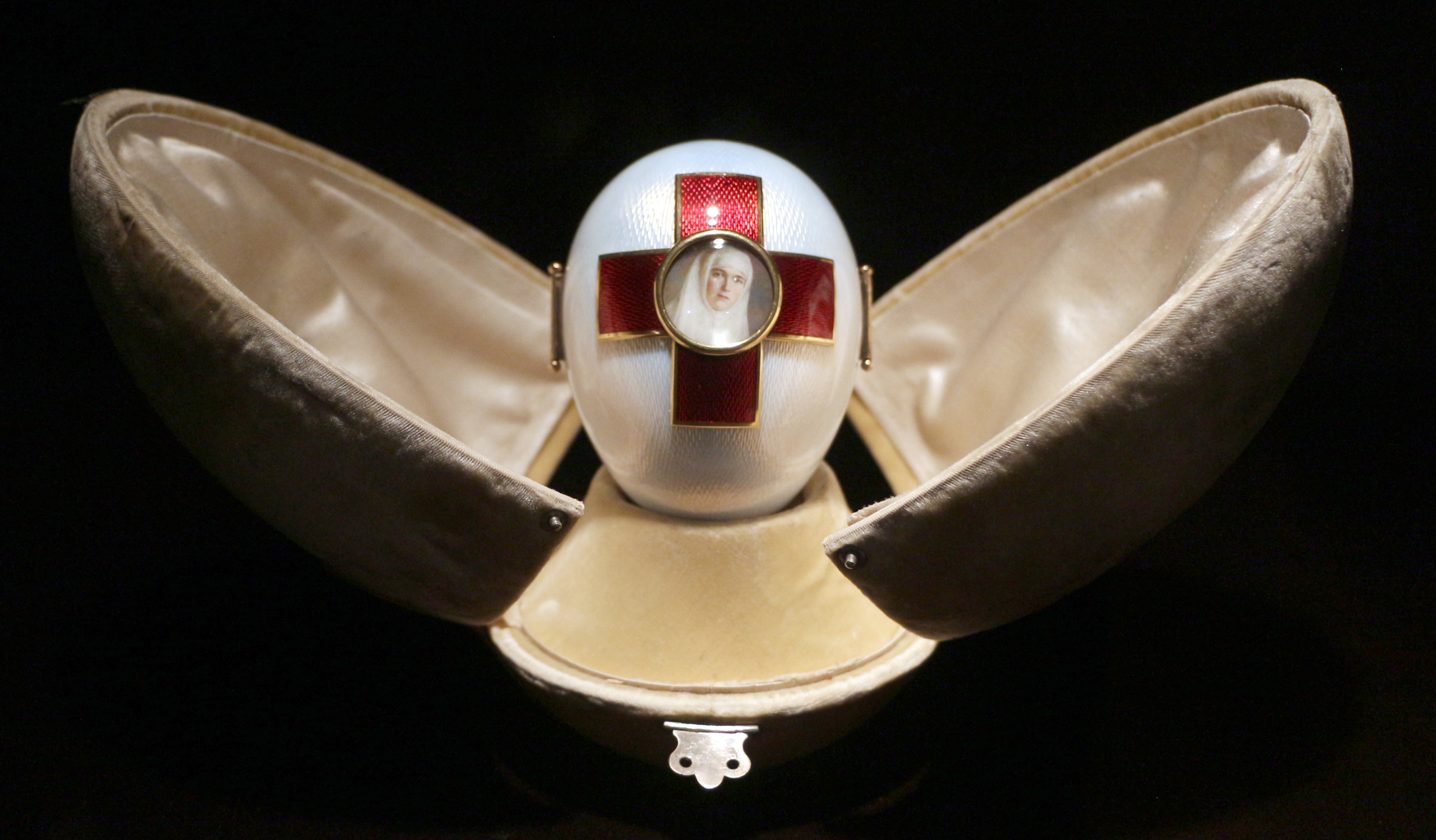
- Year delivered: 1915
- Customer: Nicholas II
- Recipient: Alexandra Feodorovna

Current owner
- Individual or institution: Cleveland Museum of Art
- Year of acquisition: 1965

Design and materials
- Workmaster: Henrik Wigström
- Materials used: Silver, gold, opalescent white and translucent red enamel, watercolor on gold and glass
- Height: 86 millimetres (3.4 in)
- Width: 63.5 millimetres (2.50 in)
- Surprise: Triptych

The Red Cross with Triptych egg, also known as Red Cross Triptych egg or Red Cross Egg with Resurrection Triptych, is an enameled Easter egg made under the supervision of the Russian jeweler Peter Carl Fabergé in 1915, for Nicholas II of Russia. Nicholas II presented the Fabergé egg to his wife Empress Alexandra Fyodorovna on Easter 1915.

== Craftsmanship ==
The egg was created by Fabergé's workmaster, Henrik Wigström (Finnish, 1860–1923) is made of silver, gold, opalescent white and translucent red enamel, watercolor on gold and glass. The white enamel on this gold-mounted egg is decorated with a translucent red enamel cross on either side. The egg measures 8.6 by 6.35 centimetres (3.39 in × 2.50 in). The center of each cross is set with a painted miniature of respectively Grand Duchess Olga and Grand Duchess Tatiana in their Red Cross uniforms. The front cross with the portrait of Tatiana serves as a clasp, securing the double opening doors. The front of the egg divides into two quarters when opened, reveals a triptych within.

The central scene is the Harrowing of Hell, the Orthodox representation of the Resurrection. Saint Olga, the founder of Christianity in Russia is represented on the left wing of the triptych. The martyr Saint Tatiana on the right. The interior miniatures are executed by Adrian Prachow, who specialized in icons. The remaining two panels of the doors are inscribed with the crown monogram of the tsarina, and the other one with the year "1915". The two miniature portraits of the two Grand Duchesses are probably by the court painter Vasilii Zuiev, who painted the miniatures for the companion Red Cross with Imperial Portraits Egg. This is one of the few Tsar Imperial Easter Eggs that opens vertically. The 1913 Winter Egg is another.

== Ownership ==
In 1930, the Red Cross with Triptych Egg was sold by the Antikvariat in Moscow to an unknown buyer. Purchased in 1943 by India Early Minshall, widow of the founder of Pocahontas Oil Company, T. Ellis Minshall, at "A La Vieille Russie" in New York. India Early Minshall wrote "The Story of My Russian Cabinet", and noted "Fabergé was called the Cellini of the North, but I do not think any jeweler can ever be compared to him." In 1965, India Early Minshall bequeathed her collection to the Cleveland Museum of Art, Ohio, United States.
