= John Lee Pratt =

American businessman

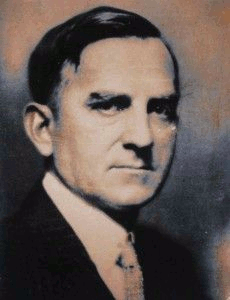
John Lee Pratt, American industrialist (1879-1975)

John Lee Pratt (October 22, 1879 – December 22, 1975) was an American industrialist born on the county line of Stafford and King George County, Virginia. He received an engineering degree from the University of Virginia, entered the ranks of American business executives in two major U.S. corporations, and later purchased and helped preserve historic Chatham Manor in Stafford County, Virginia which, upon his death, he gave to the National Park Service (as well as an adjacent bluff to the local government, which named the resulting park after him).

== Education and employment ==
Pratt was a farm boy adept at fixing things. After a year at Randolph Macon College, Pratt matriculated at the University of Virginia and received an Engineering Degree in 1902. After beginning his business career with the DuPont Company and, particularly serving with note during World War I in its Washington state plant, Pratt was selected in 1919 by Pierre S. du Pont to work in a corporation newly invested in by du Pont and other significant, wealthy businessmen—General Motors Corporation, which was founded in 1908 by William Durant. Pratt was, in effect, DuPont's man on the inside, initially solely looking out for DuPont's interests.

Pratt rose to become a member of the corporation's executive committee and, from 1923 until 1968, served on GM's Board of Directors. He was later a company Vice President and is credited with supporting the idea of holding (as opposed to selling off) what became the Frigidaire Division of GM and encouraging the development of the coolant, Freon. At first, he was assistant to the president of the company. Later, Alfred Sloan—one of GM's early executives and later President—cited John Pratt as "one of the best business executives" he had ever known. Unheralded might be another adjective applied to Pratt. In a 1950's survey, Fortune magazine listed Pratt as 17th on a list of the 50 wealthiest persons in the United States.

In 1931, he bought "Chatham Manor," an expansive Georgian, Colonial mansion on the Rappahannock River in Stafford County, VA, opposite Fredericksburg as his future retirement home. He paid $150,000 in cash for the property, roughly the equivalent of $2.4 Million in 2020. By moving to "Chatham," he was—in effect—moving back to his hometown area.

=== War Resources Board ===
During World War II, Pratt was one of many "Dollar-a-Year" men -- businessmen who aided adapting the U.S. economy to the war effort. He was appointed by President of the United States Franklin D. Roosevelt to serve on the War Resources Board serving under Edward Stettinius Jr. He later continued his public service as a member of the Lend-Lease Administration, in which capacity he came into contact with important leaders of his day, including United States Secretary of State George C. Marshall who visited Chatham to go duck hunting. In these capacities in Washington, D.C., Pratt also met General (and later president) Dwight D. Eisenhower who was a guest at Chatham. He traveled to London, as well, reporting back to Roosevelt about Britain's condition and readiness for the war.

== Philanthropy ==
John Lee Pratt was a "quiet philanthropist" who donated 250 shares of GM stock to the Virginia Museum of Fine Arts in 1940 to “foster the personal, creative efforts of Virginia’s best artists and most promising art students who are in need of financial assistance”. His will provided that the bulk of his estate—more than $60 million (approximately $240 million in today’s dollars)—would go to ten colleges. Of these, $11.5 million was provided to Virginia Tech with funds split between the College of Engineering and the College of Agriculture and Life Sciences.

== Personal life ==
Pratt and his wife, Lillian, continued the restoration of the historic property throughout much of their lives. After she died in 1947, he tired of the constant flow of visitors arriving to tour the property which, in the Colonial era, entertained George Washington and, during the American Civil War, Abraham Lincoln. The extensive gardens, installed by the estate's earlier owners during the 1920s, were, to him, a bothersome draw for curious visitors. He had the intricately designed garden area dug up and reinstalled in a more subdued design.

Mr. and Mrs. Pratt had been deeply involved in the local community in their later years and were quiet philanthropists supporting University programs in Virginia and college educations for worthwhile community young people who had been identified for their potential by other religious and community leaders. In none of these endeavors did they seek publicity or recognition.

Many of the late 20th-century leaders of the Fredericksburg area communities and businesses were later revealed to have been supported in their college education years by the Pratts. The community leaders of this era are only now retiring or, actually, dying.

After his wife died, Pratt continued to socialize with his former childhood friends in Fredericksburg, walking regularly into the city even though he could have afforded a chauffeur and any car in the GM fleet. His rumpled appearance belied his comfortable station in life while he continued his lifelong associations and played in weekly penny-ante poker games with his friends.

Lillian Pratt died in 1947 and willed her extensive jewelry collection to the then-new Virginia Museum of Fine Arts in Richmond, Virginia. Since the 1920s, encouraged by a family acquaintance, the businessman Armand Hammer, she had accumulated a large collection of Peter Carl Fabergé jewelry, including five Fabergé Imperial Easter Eggs; the Revolving Miniatures, Pelican, Peter the Great, Czarevich, Red Cross with Imperial Portraits examples, as well as pins and bracelets which were being sold by the then-new government of the Soviet Union to raise capital for the Soviet state. This collection, at the time the largest private collection of such items, had been initially acquired through purchases on her Lord & Taylor Department Store charge account. The "Lillian Pratt Collection" at the Virginia Museum of Fine Arts is a key part of that institution's exhibits. Lillian Pratt is buried in Tacoma, Washington.

== Death ==
Upon his death in 1975, "Chatham Manor" and 30 acres (120,000 m^{2}) surrounding were bequeathed to the National Park Service, which now uses the estate for its headquarters facility in the Fredericksburg and Spotsylvania National Military Park as well as a free museum open to the public (but with more limited hours than the grounds and gardens). Pratt also willed a portion of the Chatham estate (an adjacent bluff overlooking the Rappahannock River) to the local community to be used as a park, and which was named in his honor. Pratt also gave a bequest to establish the local YMCA; and in his lifetime made major donations to the Virginia Museum of Fine Arts.

At the time of his death, Fortune magazine listed Pratt as the "single largest shareholder" in General Motors, and it was reported that Pratt owned approximately 17.4 percent of the company.

The remainder of his estate was auctioned, with the proceeds donated to the University of Virginia (his alma mater), Virginia Tech, Washington and Lee University and Johns Hopkins University.

His cremated remains rest in Oak Hill Cemetery in Fredericksburg, Virginia.

== Papers ==
Held at the University of Virginia, the Papers of John Lee Pratt, 1931, 1940-1972 is a collection of 2300 items that deal primarily with Pratt’s educational philanthropy especially for medical and scientific research at Johns Hopkins’ McCollum Pratt Institute and the science departments at the University of Virginia. In addition, there are papers relating to his interest in radio.
