= Red Cross with Imperial Portraits (Fabergé egg) =

1915 Imperial Fabergé egg

Red Cross with Imperial Portraits Fabergé egg
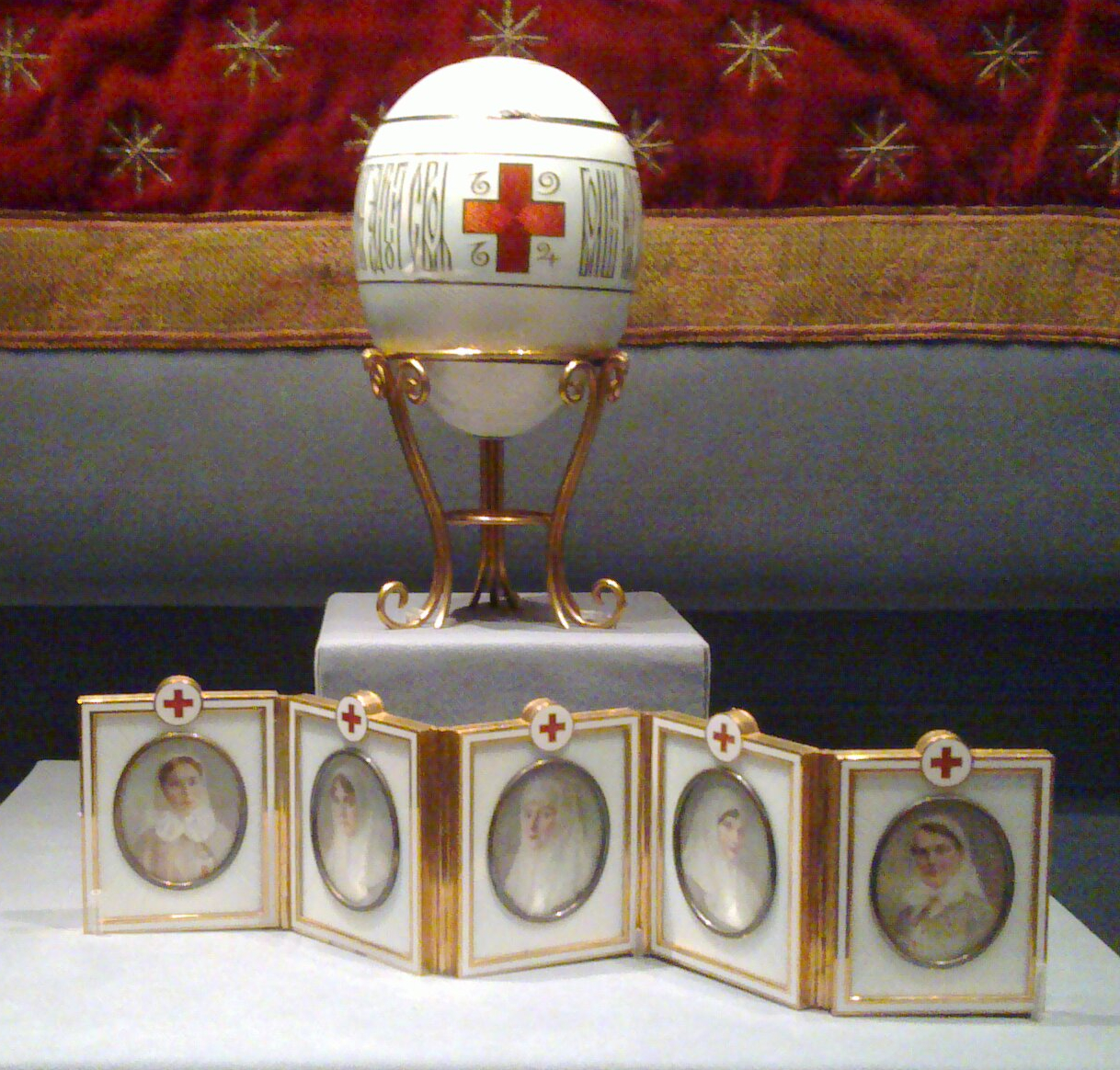
- The egg on a later stand modelled after that of the Peter the Great egg
- Year delivered: 1915
- Customer: Nicholas II
- Recipient: Maria Feodorovna

Current owner
- Individual or institution: Virginia Museum of Fine Arts
- Year of acquisition: 1947

Design and materials
- Workmaster: Henrik Wigström
- Materials used: Enamel, jewels
- Surprise: Five miniature portraits

The Red Cross with Imperial portraits egg (or the Imperial Red Cross Easter Egg) is a jewelled and enameled Easter egg made by Henrik Wigström (1862–1923) under the supervision of the Russian jeweller Peter Carl Fabergé in 1915, for Nicholas II of Russia, who presented the Fabergé egg to his mother, the Dowager Empress Maria Feodorovna, in the same year.

== Design ==
The Imperial Red Cross Easter Egg is made of silver, with the shell surrounded by a series of horizontal bands edged in gold. The bands each have a different guilloche pattern and are covered in white enamel. Two red crosses, made of enamel, are on either side of the egg. One includes the date "1914" and the other "1915". Inscribed on the outside of the egg are the words, "Greater Love hath no man than this, to lay down his life for his friends". Dowager Empress Maria Fedorovna's monogram is displayed on the top of the shell.

== Surprise ==
The surprise is a hinged, folding screen of five oval miniature portraits of women from the House of Romanov, each wearing the uniform of the Red Cross. The miniatures were possibly painted by Vasily Ivanovich Zuiev (active with Faberge from 1903–1918). The portraits are of the Grand Duchess Olga Alexandrovna of Russia, Nicholas II's sister, Grand Duchess Olga Nikolaevna of Russia, his eldest daughter, Tsarina Alexandra Feodorovna, Grand Duchess Tatiana Nikolaevna of Russia, the Tsar's second daughter, and the Grand Duchess Maria Pavlovna, the Tsar's first cousin.

Each portrait is painted on ivory and is situated in a mother-of-pearl and gold screen that folds so that it may fit inside the egg. The inside of the egg is velvet-lined to secure the enfolded frame. On the back of each portrait is a golden monogram of the sitter.

== History ==
Maria Fyodorovna, Tsar Nicholas II's mother, served with the Red Cross during the 1877 Russo-Turkish war, and was later president of the Red Cross from 1894 until her death. When the Tsar presented the Imperial Red Cross Egg to her at Eastertide 1915, she was still serving as head of the Russian branch of the International Red Cross.

At the outbreak of World War I in 1914, Alexandra and her older daughters, Olga and Tatiana, enrolled as trainee nurses and the Imperial palaces were converted into provisional hospitals. Following the collapse of the Romanov dynasty during the Russian Revolution, the Dowager Empress was one of the few immediate family members to escape the Red Army. In April 1919 she fled to her native home of Denmark, leaving the Imperial Red Cross Easter Egg behind.

In 1930, the Imperial Red Cross Easter Egg was sold with nine other Imperial eggs by the Antikvariat to the Armand Hammer Galleries in New York City. It was the first of five Imperial Faberge eggs purchased by Lillian Thomas Pratt, the wife of John Lee Pratt, in 1933. Her Fabergé collection was willed to the Virginia Museum of Fine Arts in Richmond, Virginia, upon her death in 1947. The Imperial Red Cross Easter Egg is currently on view as part of the European Decorative Art Collection.

== See also ==
- Egg decorating

== Sources ==
- Faber, Toby (2008). Faberge's Eggs: The Extraordinary Story of the Masterpieces That Outlived an Empire. Random House. ISBN 978-1-4000-6550-9.
- Forbes, Christopher; Prinz von Hohenzollern, Johann Georg (1990). FABERGE; The Imperial Eggs. Prestel. ASIN B000YA9GOM.
- Lowes, Will (2001). Fabergé Eggs: A Retrospective Encyclopedia. Scarecrow Press. ISBN 0-8108-3946-6.
- Snowman, A Kenneth (1988). Carl Faberge: Goldsmith to the Imperial Court of Russia. Gramercy. ISBN 0-517-40502-4.
