= Nyerges =

Nyerges is a Hungarian surname. Notable people with the name include:

- Alex Nyerges (born 1957), American artist and arts administrator
- Julia Takacs Nyerges (born 1989), Hungarian-born Spanish race walker
- Krisztián Nyerges (born 1977), Hungarian footballer
