= Rock Crystal (Fabergé egg) =

1896 Imperial Fabergé egg

Egg with Revolving Miniatures Fabergé egg
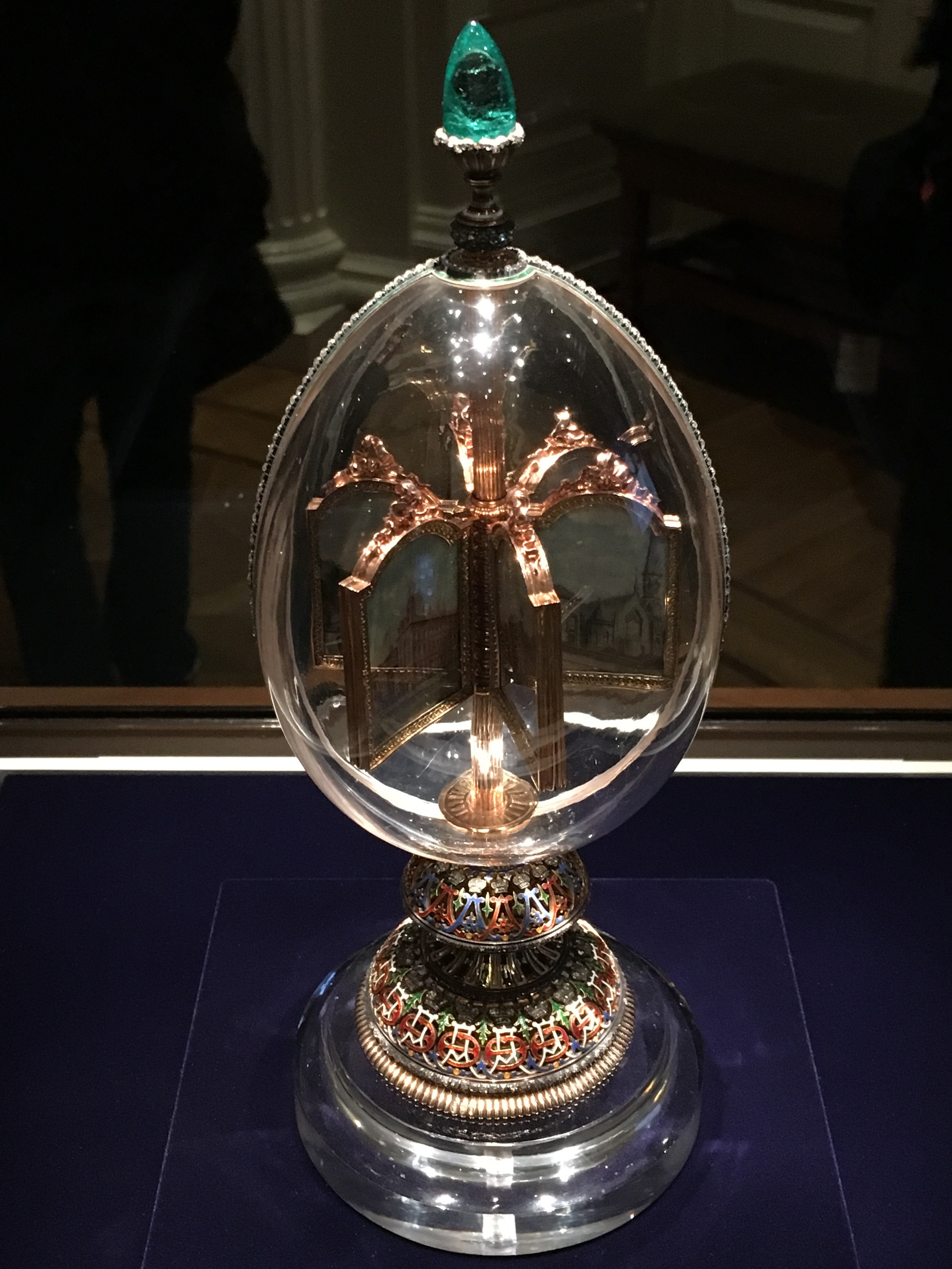
- Year delivered: 1896
- Customer: Nicholas II
- Recipient: Alexandra Feodorovna

Current owner
- Individual or institution: Virginia Museum of Fine Arts
- Year of acquisition: 1947

Design and materials
- Workmaster: Michael Perkhin
- Materials used: Gold, rock crystal, emeralds, diamonds, vitreous enamel
- Height: 248 mm (9 3/4 in)
- Width: 98 mm (3 7/8 in.)
- Surprise: Pressing the emerald at the apex revolves the miniature paintings inside the egg

The Rock Crystal egg or Revolving Miniatures egg is an Imperial Fabergé egg, one in a series of fifty-two jeweled eggs made under the supervision of Peter Carl Fabergé for the Russian Imperial family. It was created in 1896 for Empress Alexandra Feodorovna. The egg currently resides in the Virginia Museum of Fine Arts.

== Design ==
The egg was created by Faberge's workmaster, Mikhail Evlampievich Perkhin (Russian, 1860–1903) with miniatures by Johannes Zehngraf (Danish, 1857–1908) It stands about 248 mm (9 3/4 in) tall on its stand, with a diameter of 98 mm (3 7/8 in.) The outer shell is rock crystal banded with emerald-green enameled gold studded with diamonds. On the apex of the egg is a 27-carat (5.4 g) Siberian emerald supported by an emerald-green enameled gold mount. This cabochon-style emerald is one of the largest gemstones Fabergé used in any of the Imperial eggs. The egg's base sits on a plinth of rock crystal. The base consists of a colorfully enameled gold double spheroid which is circled twice with rose-cut diamonds. It has the monograms of the Tsarina, as the Princess Alix of Hesse-Darmstadt before her marriage, and later as Alexandra Fedorovna, Empress of Russia. Each monogram is surmounted with a diamond crown of the respective royal house. These monograms form a continuous pattern around the base of the egg.

== Surprise ==
Inside the rock crystal egg is a gold support holding twelve miniature paintings. The paintings are of the various palaces and residences that were significant to the Empress. Each location holds a special memory for Nicholas and Alexandra in the early days of their courtship, as they had just been married two years prior, in 1894.

When the large cabochon emerald on the apex is depressed it engages a mechanism that rotates the miniatures inside the egg. A hook moves down and folds the framed pictures back, like the pages of a book, so two paintings can be fully seen at one time. Each miniature is framed in gold with an emerald on the apex. The frames are attached to a central fluted gold shaft which passes vertically through the egg.

The locations include:

- New Palace Darmstadt: The palace in which the princess was born.
- Kranichstein, Hesse, hunting château Kranichstein: A favorite summer residence of the Empress' youth.
- Balmoral Castle, Scotland: Childhood holiday destination of Alexandra, owned by her grandmother Queen Victoria.
- Veste Coburg (Coburg Fortress), Coburg: The palace where Nicholas and Alexandra were engaged to be married, during the wedding of Alexandra's brother Ernie, Ernest Louis, Grand Duke of Hesse to Victoria Melita, Princess Victoria Melita of Saxe-Coburg and Gotha in 1894.
- Wolfsgarten, Hesse: Hunting lodge Alexandra's family visited as a child.
- Windsor Castle, near London, England: A residence of Queen Victoria where Alexandra visited as a child.
- Cathcart House (and West Park United Reformed Church), Harrogate, UK: Boarding House where Alexandra stayed while taking the baths in Harrogate and where she became godmother to the just born Allen twins.
- Schloss Rosenau, Coburg: A site Nicholas and Alexandra visited the day after their engagement.
- Osborne House, Isle of Wight: Site of Nicholas' visit to see Alexandra while they were engaged.
- The Winter Palace, St. Petersburg: The site of Nicholas and Alexandra's wedding.
- The Anichkov Palace, St. Petersburg: Residence of Maria Feodorovna, where Alexandra spent her first year in Russia.
- The Alexander Palace, Tsarskoe Selo, near St. Petersburg: the Imperial family's favorite winter residence.

== History ==
The egg was presented by Nicholas II to Alexandra Fedorovna on March 24, 1896. She received it at Eastertide in the same year that the young couple had suddenly ascended the throne.

In 1909, the egg was housed in the Empress' study in the Winter Palace. The egg was seized by the Kerensky Provisional Government and moved to the Armory Palace of the Kremlin in Moscow along with approximately 40 other eggs. In 1930, the Rock Crystal Egg was one of the ten Eggs sold by the Antikvariat (Trade Department) to the Hammer Galleries in New York City for 8000 rubles, or approximately $4000 U.S. In 1945 the egg became the last of five Imperial Easter Eggs bought by Lillian Thomas Pratt, the wife of a General Motors executive John Lee Pratt. Upon Lillian Thomas Pratt's death in 1947, the egg was willed to Virginia Museum of Fine Arts, Richmond, Virginia. It remains on view as part of the Virginia Museum of Fine Art's European Decorative Art collection.

== Sources ==
- Faber, Toby (2008). Faberge's Eggs: The Extraordinary Story of the Masterpieces That Outlived an Empire. Random House. ISBN 978-1-4000-6550-9.
- Forbes, Christopher; Prinz von Hohenzollern, Johann Georg (1990). FABERGE; The Imperial Eggs. Prestel. ASIN B000YA9GOM.
- Lowes, Will (2001). Fabergé Eggs: A Retrospective Encyclopedia. Scarecrow Press. ISBN 0-8108-3946-6.
- Snowman, A Kenneth (1988). Carl Faberge: Goldsmith to the Imperial Court of Russia. Gramercy. ISBN 0-517-40502-4.
