= Virginia Museum of Fine Arts =

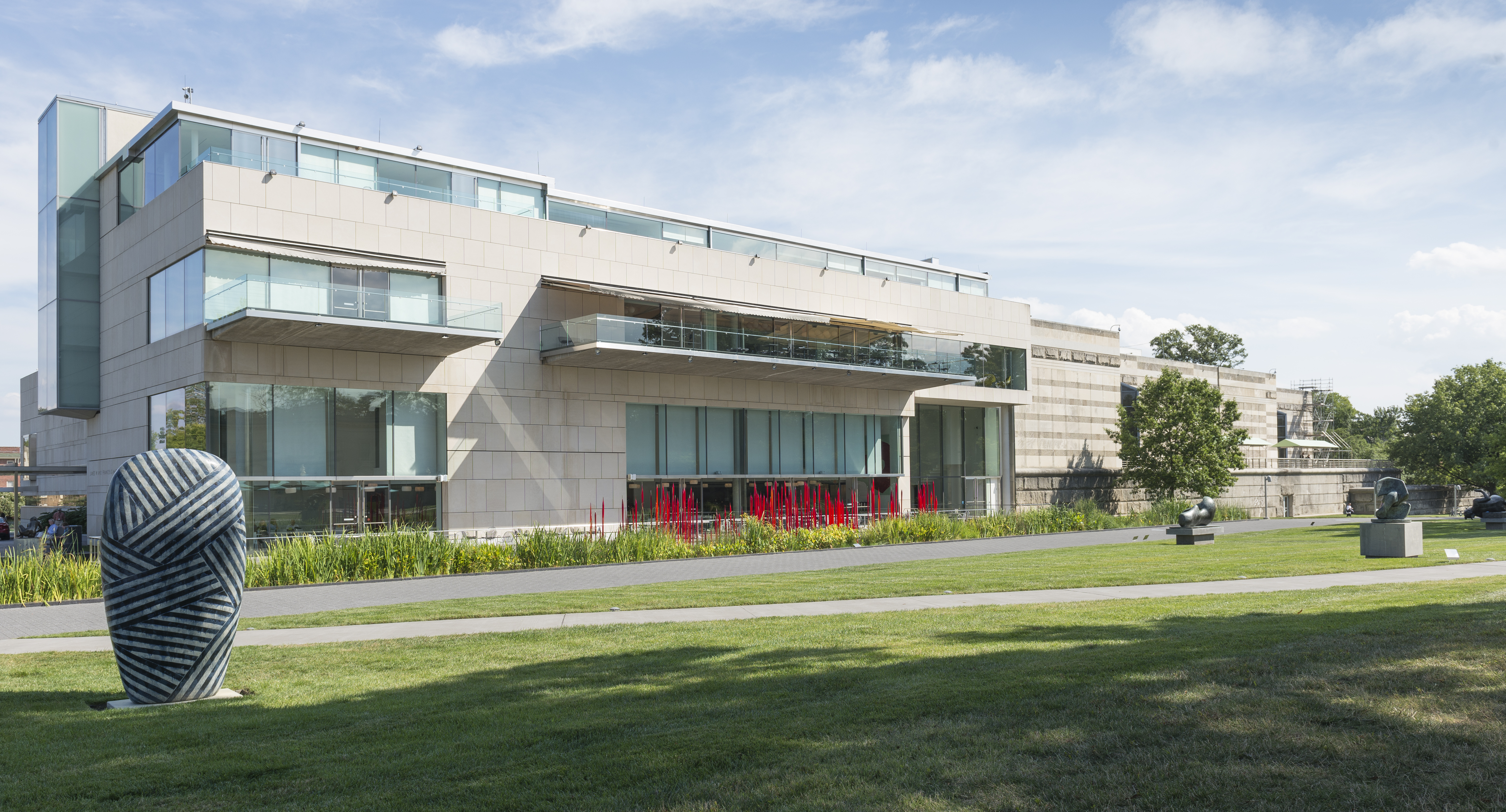
- View from the sculpture garden, 2014
- Interactive fullscreen map
- Established: March 27, 1934
- Location: 200 N. Arthur Ashe Blvd., Richmond, VA 23220
- Coordinates: 37°33′23″N 77°28′29″W
- Type: Art museum
- Accreditation: American Alliance of Museums
- Key holdings: Fabergé eggs; Rumors of War by Kehinde Wiley
- Collections: Modern and Contemporary art
- Collection size: 50,000 works (as of 2025)
- Director: Alex Nyerges
- Architects: Rick Mather & SMBW (2010 addition)
- Public transit access: Greater Richmond Transit Company bus route 16, stop at Grove Ave. between Thompson & Robinson.
- Website: vmfa.museum
- Virginia Museum of Fine Arts
- U.S. Historic district – Contributing property
- Built: 1936
- Architects: Peebles & Ferguson
- Architectural style: Georgian Revival; English Renaissance Revival
- Part of: Boulevard Historic District (ID86002887)
- Designated CP: September 18, 1986

The Virginia Museum of Fine Arts (VMFA) is an art museum in Richmond, Virginia, United States, which opened in 1936. The museum is owned and operated by the Commonwealth of Virginia. Private donations, endowments, and funds are used for the support of specific programs and all acquisition of artwork, as well as additional general support.

Considered among the largest art museums in North America for area of exhibition space, the VMFA's comprehensive art collection includes ancient art, African art, American art, British sporting art, and Himalayan art. Additionally, as part of their exhibit of decorative arts made by Fabergé, the museum boasts the largest public display of Fabergé eggs outside of Russia, owning five. One of the first museums in the American South to be operated by state funds, VMFA offers free admission, except for special exhibits.

The VMFA, together with the adjacent Virginia Historical Society, anchors the Museum District of Richmond, an area of the city known also as "West of the Boulevard".

The museum includes the Leslie Cheek Theater, a performing-arts venue. For 50 years, a theater company operated here, known most recently as TheatreVirginia. Built in 1955 as a 500-seat theatre within the art museum, it started as a community theater and also hosted special programs in dance, film, and music. In 1969, the director established an Actors' Equity/LORT company known as Virginia Museum Theatre, hiring both local actors and professionals from New York City or elsewhere. Some of its productions received national notice. In 1973, its production of Maxim Gorky's play Our Father transferred to New York, to the Manhattan Theater Club. Because of continuing financial problems, the nonprofit theater closed in 2002. After renovation, it reopened in 2011 as part of the museum to host a range of live performance events.

== History ==
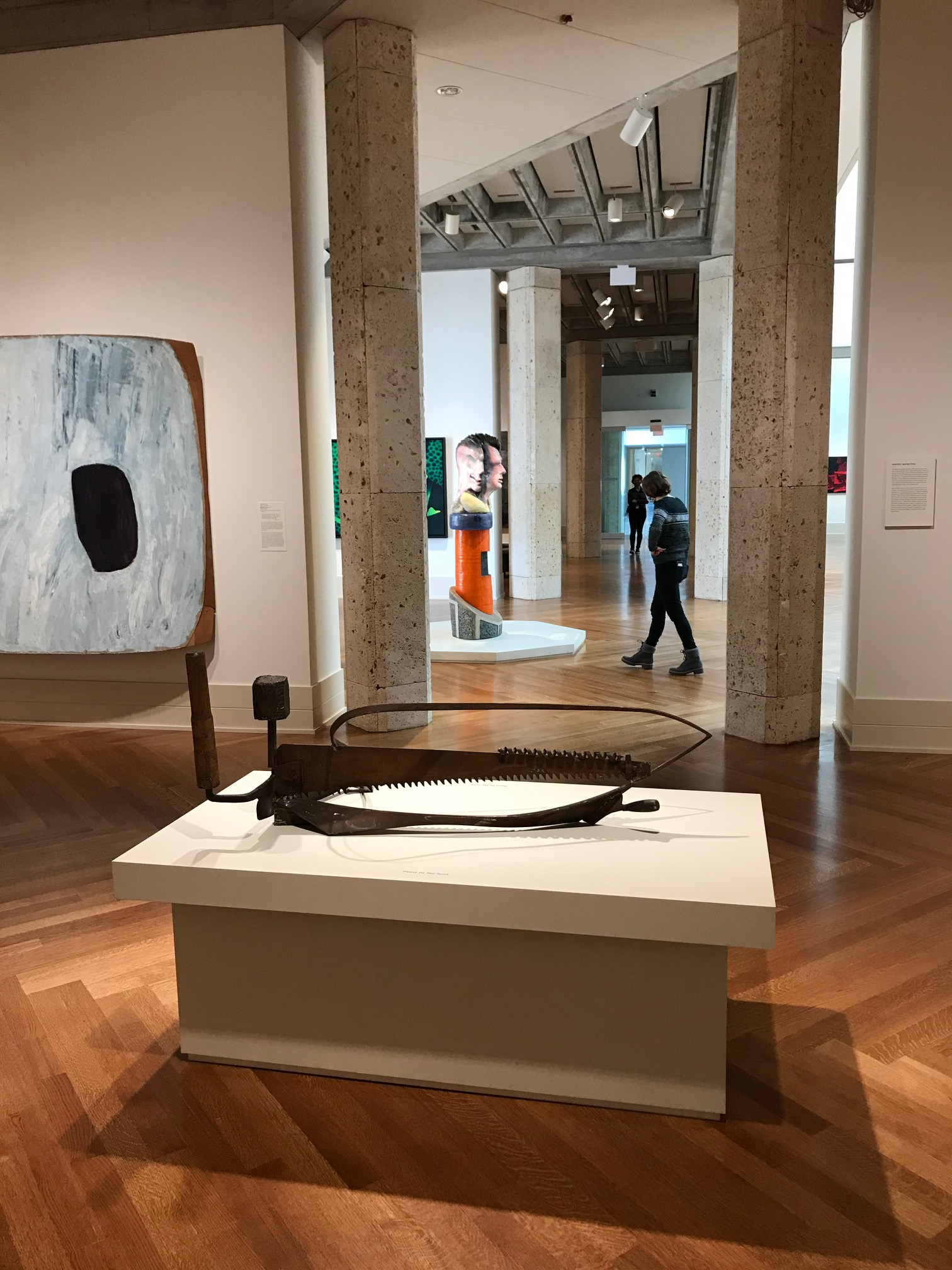
VMFA Lewis Galleries in 2021

=== Origins ===
The VMFA has its origins in a 1919 donation of 50 paintings to the Commonwealth of Virginia by Judge John Barton Payne. During the Great Depression, Payne collaborated with Virginia Governor John Garland Pollard to gain funding from the federal Works Projects Administration under President Franklin D. Roosevelt, to augment state funding and establish the state art museum in 1932. Payne's gift had been made in memory of his late second wife Jennie Byrd Bryan Payne and his mother Elizabeth Barton Payne.

The site for the museum was chosen on Richmond's Boulevard, near the corner of a contiguous six-block tract of land used as a veterans' home for Confederate soldiers. Additional services were provided to their wives and daughters.

The main building of the VMFA was designed by Peebles and Ferguson Architects of Norfolk. It has been described as Georgian Revival or English Renaissance. Commentators have said the architects expressed influence from Inigo Jones and Christopher Wren. Construction began in 1934. Two wings were originally planned, but only the central portion was then built. The museum opened on January 16, 1936.

=== Major acquisitions and first addition, 1940–1969 ===
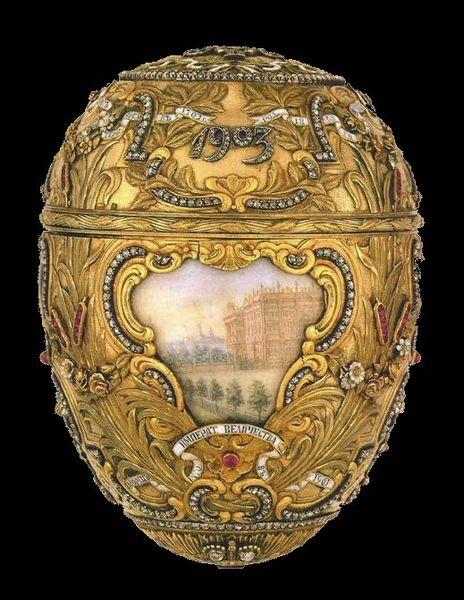
The Peter the Great Egg by the firm of Fabergé, donated to the museum in 1947.

In 1947, the VMFA was given the Lillian Thomas Pratt collection of some 150 jeweled objects created by Peter Carl Fabergé and other Russian workshops, including the largest public collection of Fabergé eggs outside of Russia. That year the Museum also received the "T. Catesby Jones Collection of Modern Art". Further donations in the 1950s came from Adolph D. Williams and Wilkins C. Williams, and from Arthur and Margaret Glasgow. They established the museum's oldest funds used for art acquisitions. In 1951, the museum bought the abstract painting Chimneys, created by a 20-year-old art student named Benjamin Leroy Wigfall at the historically Black Hampton Institute. He was the youngest person whose work had ever been purchased by the museum and was one of its earliest acquisitions of a painting by a Black artist.

In 1948, Leslie Cheek, Jr. was selected as director of the museum, where he served until 1968. During these decades, he introduced many innovations and was noted as having had significant influence on the course of the institution. His obituary in the New York Times said that he "transformed [the VMFA] from a small local gallery to a nationally known cultural center." Cheek in 1953 introduced the world's first "Artmobile", a mobile tractor-trailer that carried exhibits to rural areas (prior to museum galleries being established in distant areas). In 1960, he was the first in the United States to introduce night hours at an art museum.

Cheek worked with his curators and designers to cultivate a degree of theatrical "showmanship" in exhibits, such as velvet drapery for the Fabergé collection, a "tomb-like" setting of the museum's Egyptian exhibit, and using music to set the mood in the galleries. To enhance the museum as a cultural center, Cheek gained approval for construction of a theater, used for museum and outside societies' performing events in dance, music, and film.

During his tenure, Cheek oversaw construction of the first addition, built in 1954 by Merrill C. Lee, Architects, of Richmond, and supported financially by Paul Mellon. Cheek had gained board approval to construct a theater as part of this addition. The 500-seat theater was intended to provide space for a community theater, and for annual programs of the Virginia societies for dance, music, and film, all within a central cultural facility.

=== Virginia Museum Theatre ===
What is now known as the Leslie Cheek Theater, the 500-seat proscenium theater within VMFA was originally built in 1955 and known as the Virginia Museum Theatre. It was designed under the supervision of director Cheek, a Harvard/Yale-educated architect. He consulted with Yale Drama theater engineers Donald Oenslager and George Izenour for the state-of-the-art facility. Cheek envisioned a central role for a theater arts division in the museum. The theater brought the arts of drama, acting, design, music, and dance to the art galleries. It also hosted programs of the Virginia Film Society.

Through the 1960s, the Virginia Museum Theater (VMT) hosted a museum-sponsored volunteer or "community theater" company, under the direction of Robert Telford--link is not to this Robert Telford, who was in charge in 1965-66 season. The company presented subscription seasons of live drama to thousands annually. Local players and occasional guest professionals offered musicals (Peter Pan, e.g.), dramas (Peter Shaffer's The Royal Hunt of the Sun), and classics (Shakespeare's Hamlet). VMT also served as a venue for annual programs of the Virginia Music Society, Virginia Dance Society, and Virginia Film Society. Cheek retired from the museum in 1968, but was an adviser to the VMFA trustees about the next director of the theater arts division.

In 1969, Keith Fowler was appointed as artistic director of VMT. Under Fowler, VMT continued to serve as the headquarters for the Dance, Film and Music societies. He is known for having expanded and upgrading the live theater operations, establishing Richmond's first resident Actors Equity/LORT company. Both community actors and New York-based professionals became part of this. The troupe's core members included Marie Goodman Hunter, Janet Bell, Lynda Myles, E.G. Marshall, Ken Letner, James Kirkland, Rachael Lindhart, and dramaturg M. Elizabeth Osborn.

Fowler retained a focus on classics and musicals, but added an emphasis on new plays and U.S. premieres of foreign works. His debut production in 1969, Marat/Sade, written by Peter Weiss, was produced with the first racially integrated company on the VMT stage. While the production was praised by two Richmond newspapers, an editorial in the afternoon Richmond News Leader criticized Fowler for "latitudinarianism".

The company became known as VMT Rep (for "repertory"). Fowler attracted national notice in 1973 with his production of Macbeth, starring E.G. Marshall. Critic Clive Barnes of The New York Times hailed it as the "'Fowler Macbeth'... "splendidly vigorous... probably the goriest Shakespearean production I have seen since Peter Brook's 'Titus Andronicus'." As Fowler heightened the professional quality of the theater, VMT led Richmond into what some recall as a golden age of theater. In 1974 the VMT staged a celebrated production of Purlie that was directed by Albert Reyes and choreographed by Nat Horne.

The company commissioned and produced eight American and world premieres, introducing new plays by Americans Romulus Linney and A.R. Gurney, as well as by major foreign authors, such as Harold Pinter, Joe Orton, Athol Fugard, and Peter Handke. In 1975, the Soviet Arts Consul provided coverage on Moscow Television for Fowler's U.S premiere of Maxim Gorky's Our Father (originally Poslednje in Russian). This VMT production transferred to New York City, where it premiered at the Manhattan Theater Club.

Over eight years, VMT's subscription audience increased from 4,300 to 10,000 patrons. Fowler resigned in 1977 after a dispute with VMFA administration over the content in VMT's premiere of Romulus Linney's Childe Byron.

Artistic directors Tom Markus (1978-1985) renamed the company and its playhouse "TheatreVirginia". As with all American professional not-for-profit performing arts organizations, TheatreVirginia ran mounting deficits for years. Despite this, artistic director Terry Burgler (1986-1999), who succeeded him, had a successful operation. He later became a co-founder in 2004 of the Ohio Shakespeare Festival.

The museum board of trustees continued to underwrite the deficits to maintain the theater, but their priority was the museum. Tensions arose in this arrangement, and the board was increasingly concerned about the viability of the theater. A study in 1987 showed that dealing with a board that was essentially constituted to oversee the art museum was difficult for the theatre company. In addition, the city of Richmond was still characterized as having a "historical resistance" to the offerings of professional theatre.

Problems continued into the early 21st century, when a loss of some state funding occurred because of budget problems. In addition, the museum wanted to regain the theater space for other uses. The theater was expected to relocate in 2003, and was projected to be an anchor tenant in a new Virginia Performing Arts Center, but that was not planned for completion until 2007, and by late 2002, the theater had not found temporary relocation space. In 2002, a series of fatal sniper attacks in the metropolitan DC area and northern Virginia region killed five people in quick succession. Residents were fearful of going out, and the theater suffered reduced audiences and additional lost income. In December 2002, the board decided to close TheatreVirginia. It struggled financially to operate in a state-supported museum.

For eight years, the theater was dormant. Renovation of the space and its revival as a live performance space was completed in 2011; that year, it was renamed as the Leslie Cheek Theater in honor of its first director, who had also been director of the museum for two decades. The theater's reopening has returned live performing arts to the heart of the Virginia museum. The Leslie Cheek Theater does not support a resident company, but is available for bookings of special theater, music, film, and dance showings.

=== Building expansions 1970–1990 ===
The second addition, the South Wing, was designed by Baskervill & Son Architects of Richmond and completed in 1970. It featured four new permanent galleries and a large gallery for loan exhibitions, as well as a new library, photography lab, art storage rooms, and staff offices. A gift of funds from Sydney and Frances Lewis of Richmond in 1971, provided for the acquisition of Art Nouveau objects and furniture.

A third addition, known as the North Wing, was designed by Hardwicke Associates, Inc. of Richmond and completed in 1976. It included an adjacent sculpture garden with a cascading fountain, designed by landscape architect Lawrence Halprin. The North Wing was designed as the new main entrance for the museum, with a separate dedicated entrance added for the theater. It provided three more gallery areas – two for temporary exhibitions and one for the Lewis Family's Art Nouveau Collection while also housing a gift shop, members' dining room, and other visitor functions. However, the curved walls of the North Wing's "kidney-shaped" design proved to be functionally awkward and impractical, and it was later replaced. The 1976 wing and sculpture garden were later demolished to make room for the 2010 McGlothlin Wing.

In the following years, the Lewis and Mellon families proposed major donations from their extensive private collections, and helped provide the funds to house them. In December 1985, the museum opened its fourth addition, the 90,000-square-foot (8,400 m^{2}) West Wing. The architects, Hardy Holzman Pfeiffer Associates of New York, were chosen by the Lewises based on their appreciation of the firm's 1981 design for the Best Products headquarters building north of Richmond. The wing now houses the collections of these two families.

=== Redesigned campus and McGlothlin wing expansion 1991–2010 ===
- Home for Confederate Women
- U.S. National Register of Historic Places
- Virginia Landmarks Register
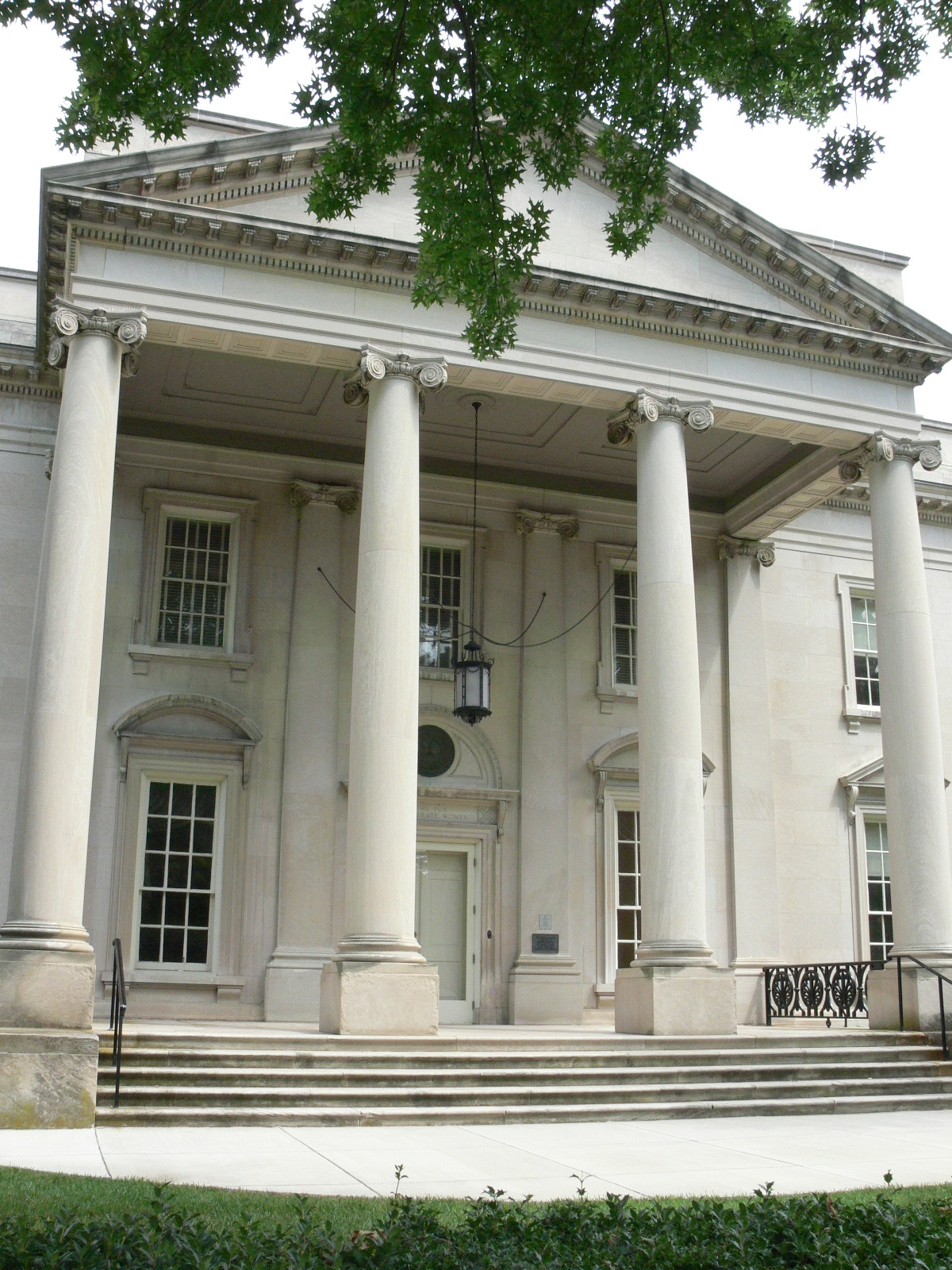
- Location: 301 N. Sheppard St., Richmond, Virginia
- Area: 2 acres (0.81 ha)
- Built: 1932
- Architects: Lee, Merrill
- Architectural style: Federal, Federal Revival
- NRHP reference No.: 85002767
- VLR No.: 127-0380

Significant dates
- Added to NRHP: November 7, 1985
- Designated VLR: April 16, 1985

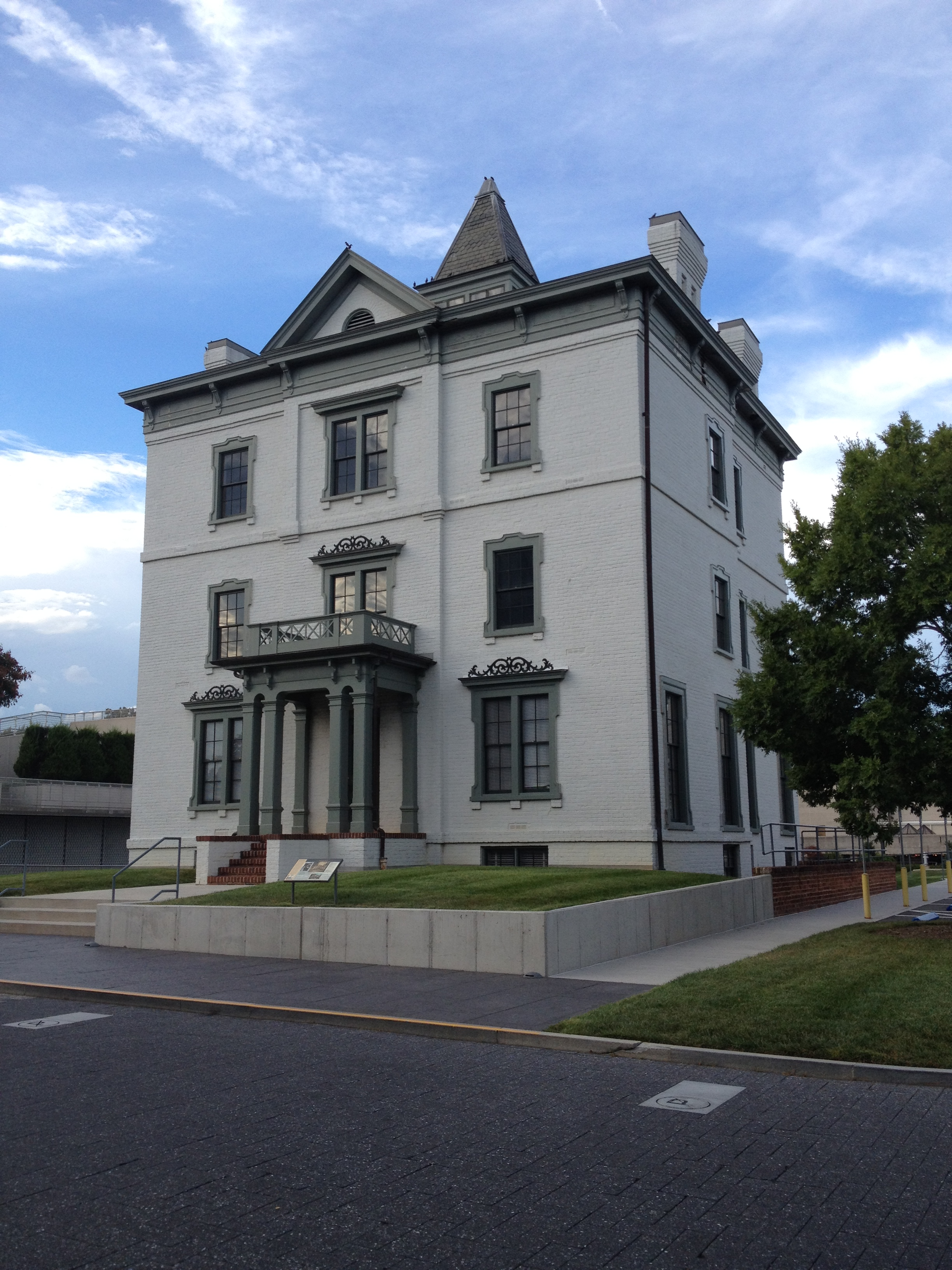
Robinson House 2014

In 1993, the Commonwealth of Virginia transferred the care of the Robinson House from the Department of General Services to VMFA. The nearly 14-acre property of Robinson House, a former veterans camp, was transferred between state agencies to the museum. Beginning in 2001, the VMFA created a master plan for development of this land in what was otherwise a built-out residential part of the city.

By the 1990s, the functions of the adjacent Confederate Home for Women had ceased, and its last residents moved out. In 1999, the former home was adapted for use as the Center for Education and Outreach (now the Pauley Center), housing the museum's Office of Statewide Partnerships.

The VMFA undertook a $150-million building expansion to increase the museum's gallery space by fifty percent, adding 165,000 square feet (15,300 m^{2}). The new wing opened in 2010 and was named in honor of patrons James W. and Frances G. McGlothlin. The museum reoriented the McGlothlin Wing by reinstating the entrance on the Boulevard, the same as with the original 1936 entrance.

The design includes a three-story atrium named for Louise B. and J. Harwood Cochrane, with a 40-foot (12 m)-tall glass wall to the east and broad expanses of glass walls to the west, and a partially glazed roof. The London-based architect Rick Mather collaborated with Richmond-based SMBW Architects in the design of the building, while landscape architecture was handled by OLIN. Landscaping included a new 4-acre (16,000 m^{2}) sculpture garden, named for philanthropists E. Claiborne and Lora Robins.

American art is the major focus of exhibitions in the McGlothlin Wing. In 2008, the museum received a $200,000 grant from the Luce Foundation to support the installation and interpretation of its American collections. Mather's design for the VMFA expansion earned a 2011 RIBA International Award for architectural excellence.

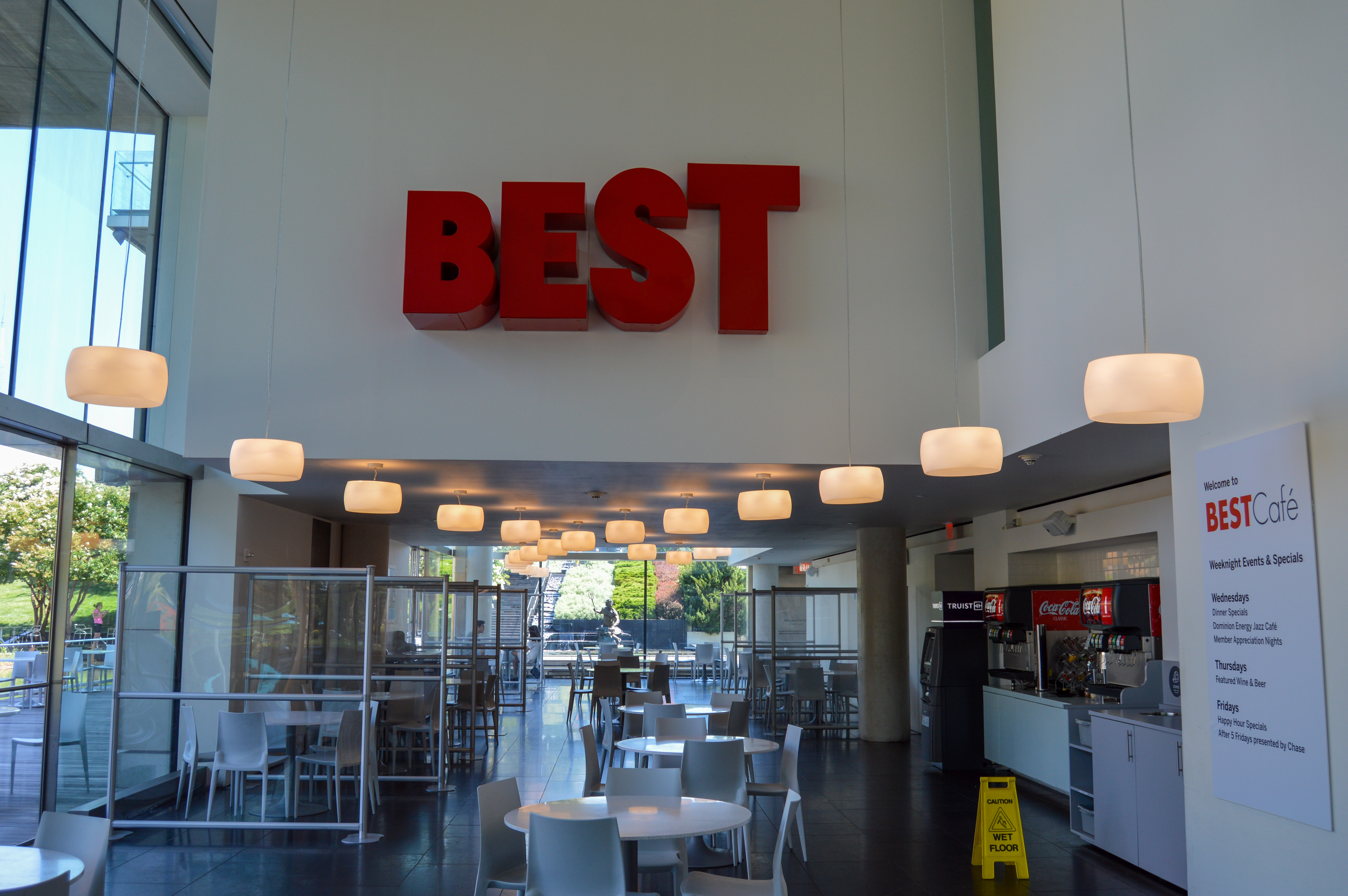
Best Café, one of two restaurants at VMFA. It was named after Best Products, which was headquartered in neighboring Henrico County.

=== Rumors of War and another expansion 2010–present ===
In 2019, Rumors of War was installed on the front lawn of the museum facing Arthur Ashe Boulevard after being displayed in Times Square.

In June 2021, the VMFA announced that architectural firm SmithGroup was designing a $190 million expansion of the museum and a renovation of current spaces such as the Evans Court and Leslie Cheek Theater. SmithGroup's preliminary designs for the new wing will add significant gallery space for African, African American, and 21st-century art, along with improved visitor amenities and event spaces. The design emphasizes sustainability, accessibility, and stronger connections between the museum and its surrounding campus.

== Permanent collection ==
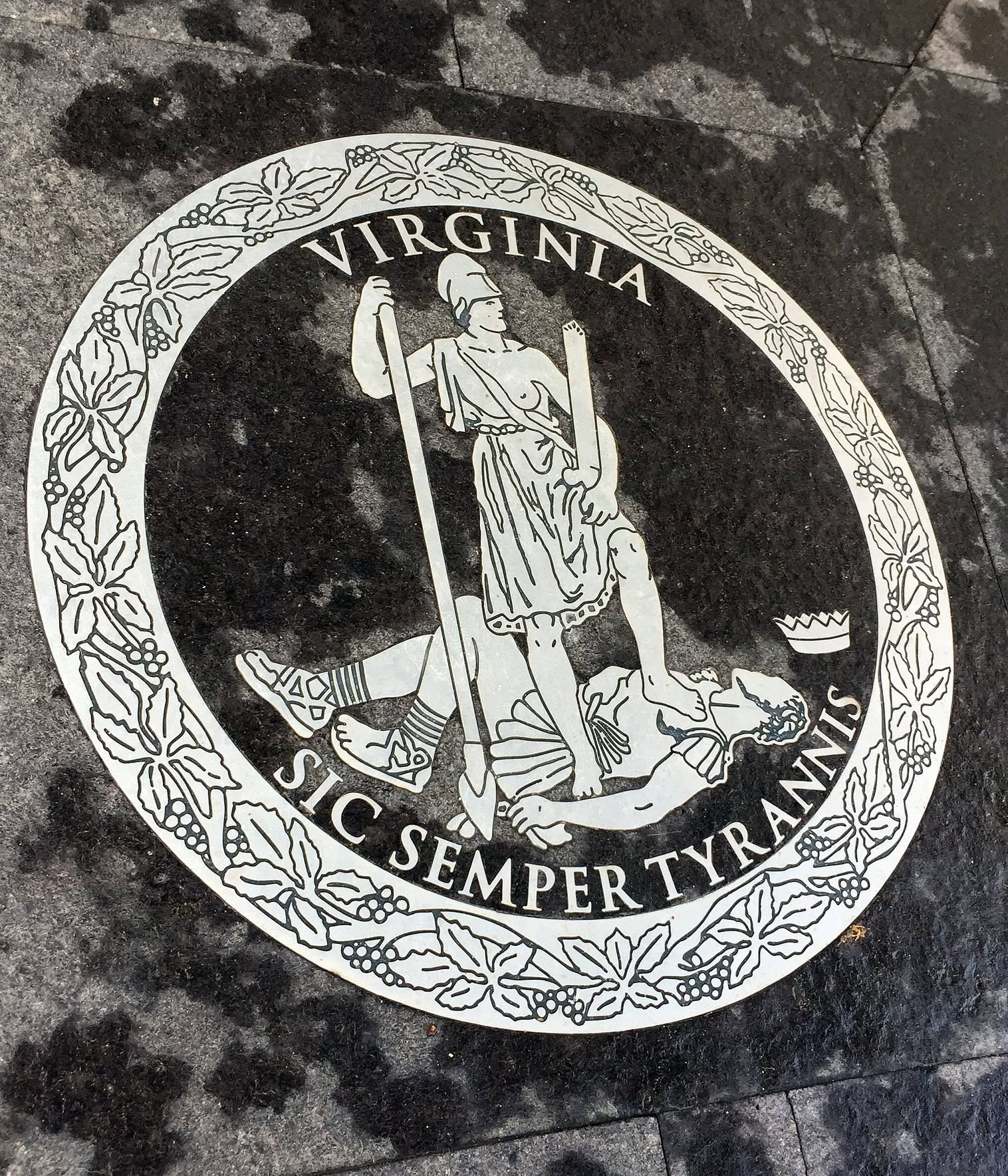
The Virginia Museum of Fine Arts is a state agency. This image of the state seal at the entrance reminds visitors that the public owns the art and that the museum maintains the collections for the enjoyment of the people.

The Virginia Museum of Fine Arts has divided its encyclopedic collections into several broad curatorial departments, which largely correspond to the galleries:

- African Art: In 1994 and 1995, the museum exhibited its entire 250-object African art collection in Spirit of the Motherland: African Art at the Virginia Museum of Fine Arts. As of 2011, the collection has grown to around 500 objects, with particular strengths in the art of the Kuba, the Akan, the Yoruba, and the Kongo peoples, and the art of Mali.
- American Art: The American art collection began with twenty works of the John Barton Payne donation. Since the 1980s, the museum has begun to systematically build its holdings in American art, aided in 1988 by the creation of an endowment by patrons Harwood and Louise Cochrane to support such acquisitions.

In 2005, the McGlothlin family promised a bequest of their collection of American art and financial support, valued at well above $100 million.
In 2022, the museum acquired at auction Portrait of a Creole Woman with Madras Tignon for $948,000, adding a piece reflective of the French and Spanish colonial heritage of the country.

- Ancient art: Begun in 1936, the Ancient collection expanded under Director Leslie Cheek, with the advice of the Brooklyn Museum and other institutions. The collection consists of works from the Ancient Egyptian, Ancient Greek, Phrygian, Etruscan, Ancient Roman, and Byzantine civilizations. It includes one of two ancient Egyptian mummies in the city of Richmond, "Tjeby" (the other is at the University of Richmond).
- Art Nouveau & Art Deco: Begun from the core collection of furniture and decorative arts the Lewis family began assembling in 1971; today it includes Art Nouveau works by René Lalique, Hector Guimard, Emile Galle, Louis Majorelle, Louis Comfort Tiffany, works by the Vienna Secession and Peter Behrens, Arts & Crafts works by Charles Rennie Mackintosh, Frank Lloyd Wright, Stickley, and Greene & Greene, and Parisian Art Deco pieces by Eileen Gray and Émile-Jacques Ruhlmann.
- East Asian art: Begun in 1941, the East Asian collection consists of Chinese, Japanese and Korean art. The collection includes Chinese jade, bronzes and Buddhist sculpture; Japanese sculpture, and paintings from Kyoto; as well as Korean ceramics and bronzes from two private collections. In 2004, the collection added two imperial Buddhist paintings from the Qing dynasty, dating from 1740. The collection includes the Rene and Carolyn Balcer Collection of works by the Japanese woodblock artist Kawase Hasui. That collection consists of some 800 works, woodblock prints, screens, watercolors and other works by Hasui, including rarely seen prints made by Hasui prior to the 1923 earthquake that destroyed half of Tokyo.

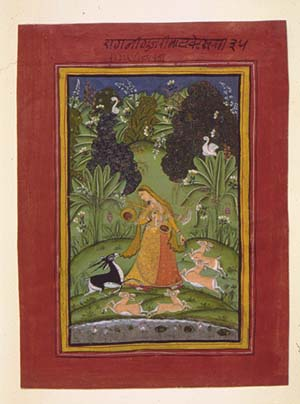
Miniature watercolor painting from Rajasthan, in the South Asian collection

- European art: The European collection began with the original 1919 Payne donation, and now includes works by Bacchiacca, Murillo, Poussin, Rosa, Gentileschi, Goya, and Bouguereau.

In 1970, Ailsa Mellon Bruce donated some 450 European decorative objects, including a group of 18th- and 19th-century gold, porcelain and enamel boxes.

Pinkney L. Near (1927 - 1990) was curator of the Virginia Museum of Fine Arts for thirty years. He was responsible for the museum's acquisition of many works of European art, including arranging for the museum to purchase the Francisco Goya portrait of General Nicolas Guye (long believed to be the most valuable work of art in the museum's collections) from John Lee Pratt. The Guye portrait by Goya is now on view in the posthumously created Pinkney Near Gallery at the VMFA. In 1989 Pinkney Near was named to the newly created post of Paul Mellon Curator and senior research curator, a post in which he continued to work closely with the Mellon Collection and Paul Mellon. Malcolm Cormack succeeded Pinkney Near as Paul Mellon Curator of European Art, from 1991 until his retirement in 2003. Mitchell Merling became Cormack's successor as curator of the Mellon Collection.

Paul Mellon's donations added to the French Impressionist and Post-Impressionist works and a collection of British Sporting Art, given to the museum in 1983. At his death in 1999, Mellon bequeathed additional French and British works, including five paintings by George Stubbs. The Mellon Galleries closed January 2, 2018 for renovations, with a scheduled reopening in 2020. Curator Mitchell Merling selected 70 major works from the VMFA Mellon Collection to tour during this period on loan to museums, such as the Frick Art and Historical Center in Pittsburgh, the Frist Center for the Visual Arts in Nashville, and the Musee de la Chasse et de la Nature in Paris. Works sent on loan during renovations of the galleries included paintings by Vincent van Gogh, Henri Rousseau, and George Stubbs.

- English silver: In 1997, a collection of 18th- and 19th-century English silver was given to the museum by Jerome and Rita Gans.
- Fabergé: The Pratt Fabergé collection, the largest collection of Fabergé eggs outside Russia, includes five Imperial Easter Eggs: the Rock Crystal Egg of 1896, the Pelican Egg of 1898, the Peter the Great Egg of 1903, the Tsarevich Egg of 1912, and the Red Cross with Imperial Portraits Egg of 1915.
- The South Asian collection comprises works from what are today India, Pakistan, Bangladesh, Sri Lanka, Nepal, and Tibet. The collection began in the late 1960s, with the initial core of the Himalayan collection being acquired in 1968.

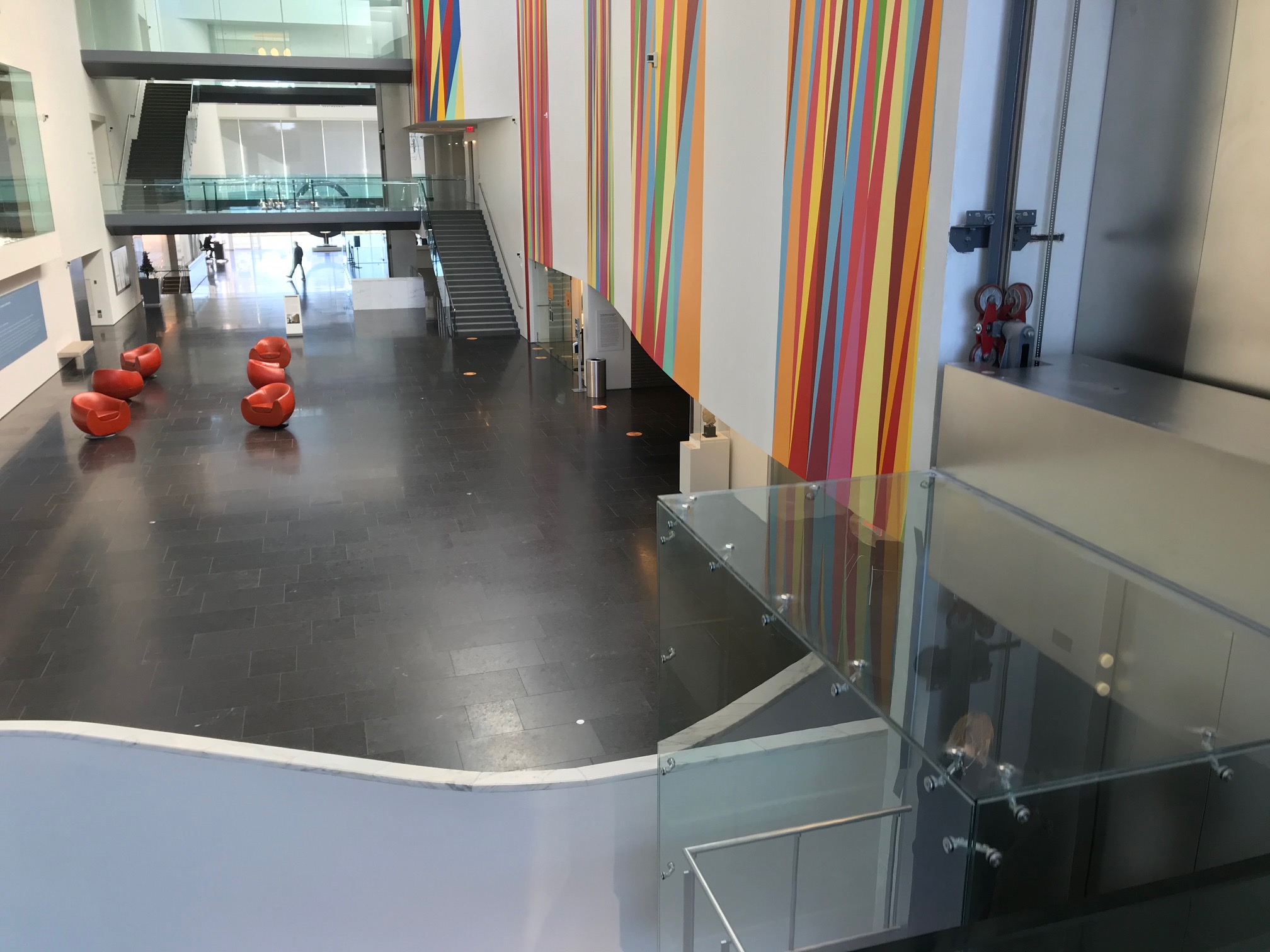
VMFA Cochrane Atrium in 2021

When the 2010 wing was completed, a 27-ton marble late-Mughal garden pavilion from Rajasthan was installed inside the galleries.

- Modern and Contemporary: The core of the Modern and Contemporary collection was assembled by Sydney and Frances Lewis in the mid- to late 20th century. Many of the more than 1,200 works in their collection were acquired by trading products (such as appliances and electronics) from their company, Best Products, to artists in exchange for works, while at the same time befriending many of them.

In 2019, the Virginia Museum of Fine Arts commissioned a large-scale monumental sculpture from artist Kehinde Wiley that was installed in front of the museum. The work in bronze, which Wiley had titled Rumors of War, was modeled after one of Monument Avenue’s Confederate statues after he visited Richmond for a retrospective exhibition of his artwork held at the museum in 2016.

== Gallery ==
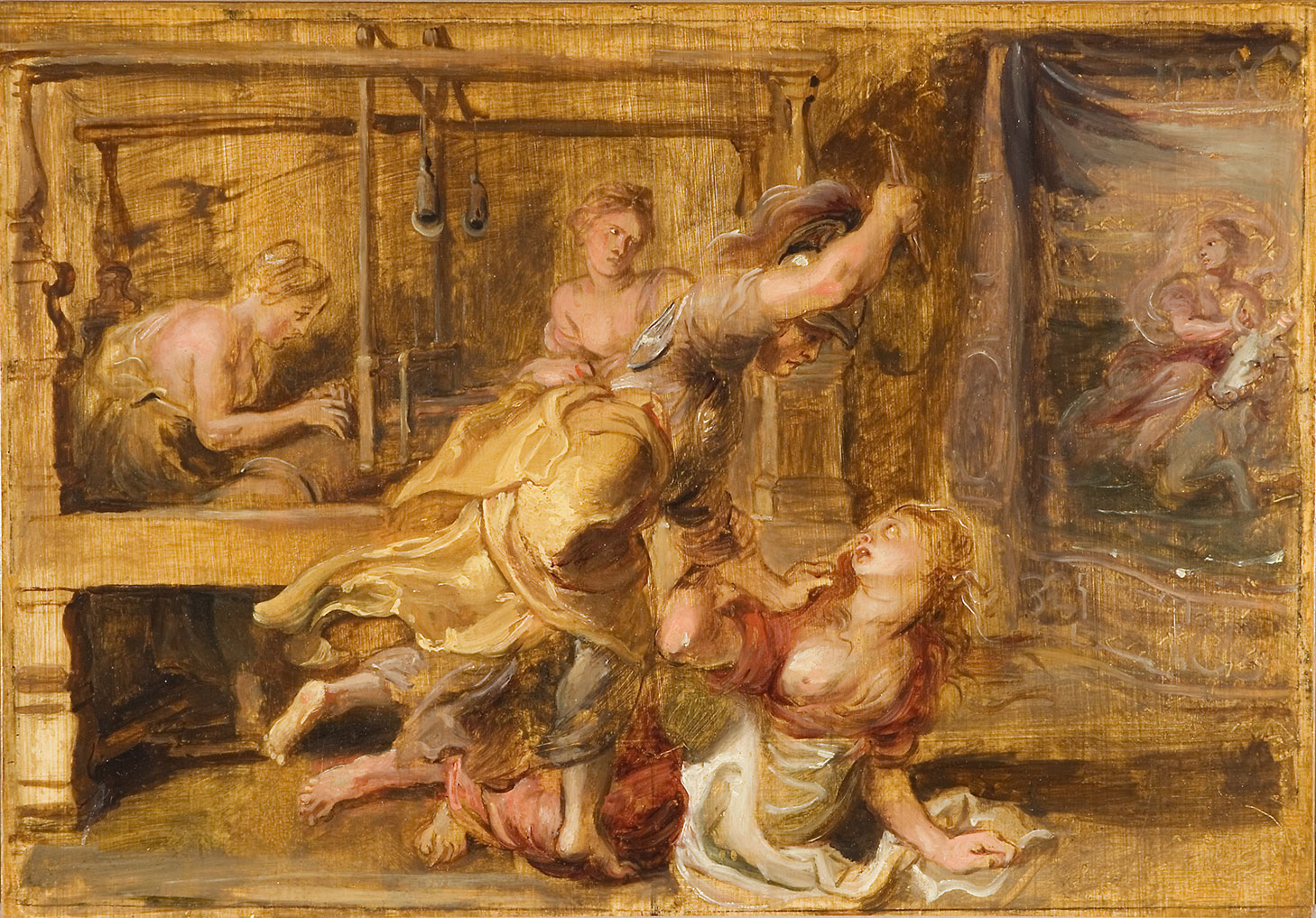
Peter Paul Rubens, Study for Pallas and Arachne, 1636–37

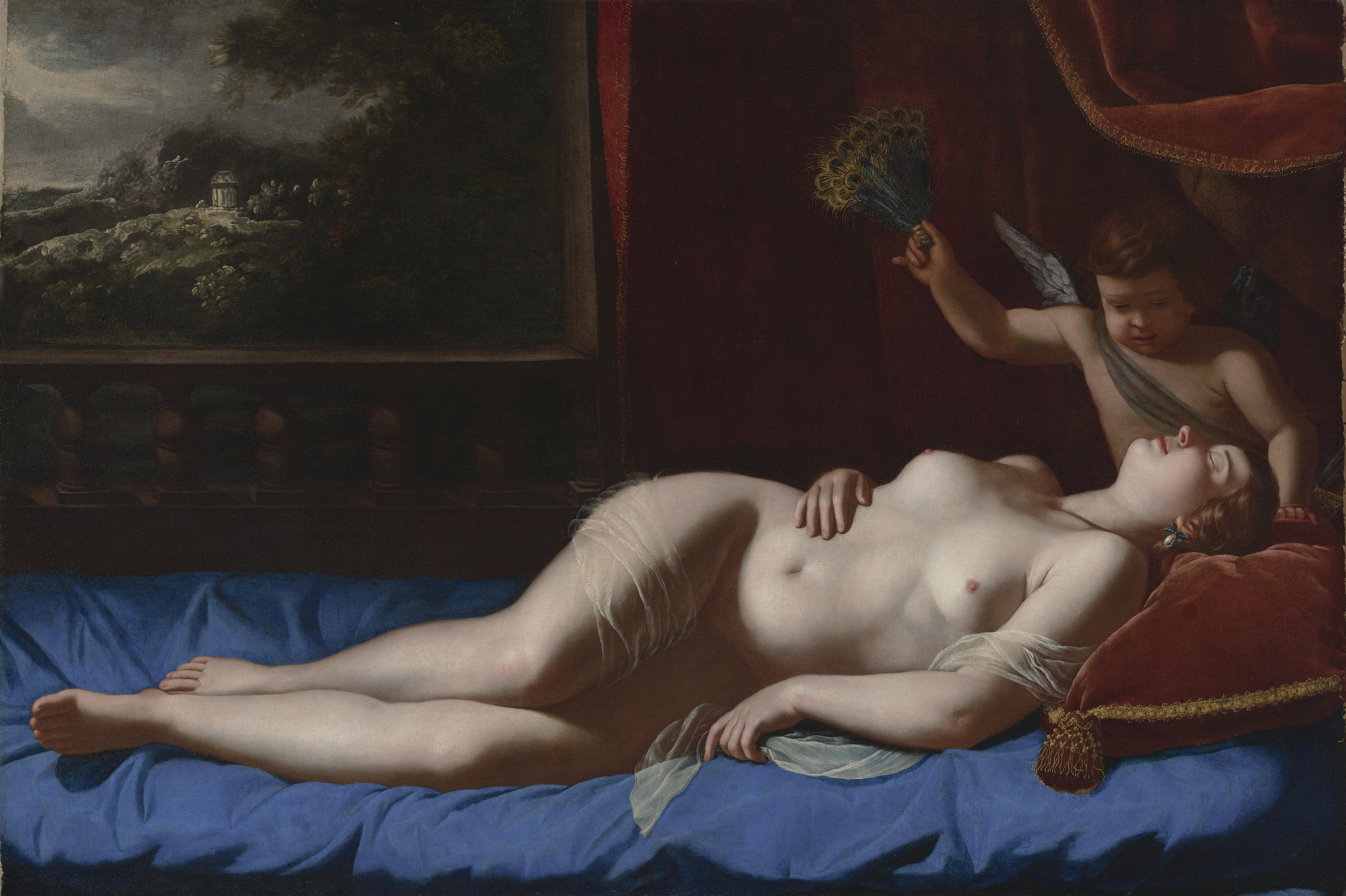
Artemisia Gentileschi, Venus and Cupid

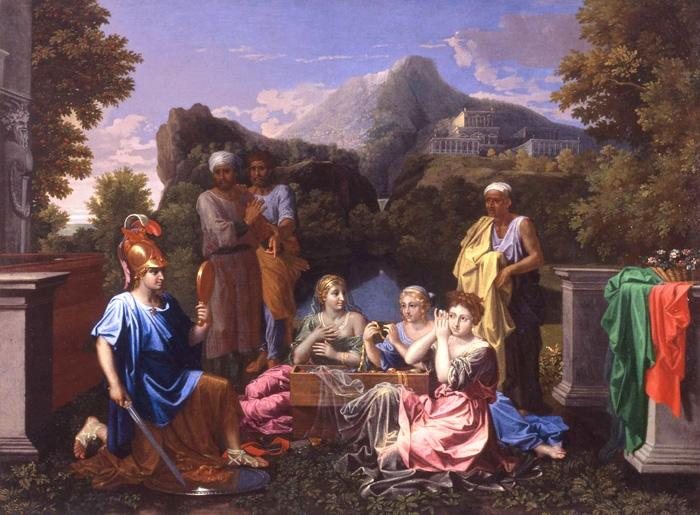
Nicolas Poussin, Achilles on Skyros, 1656

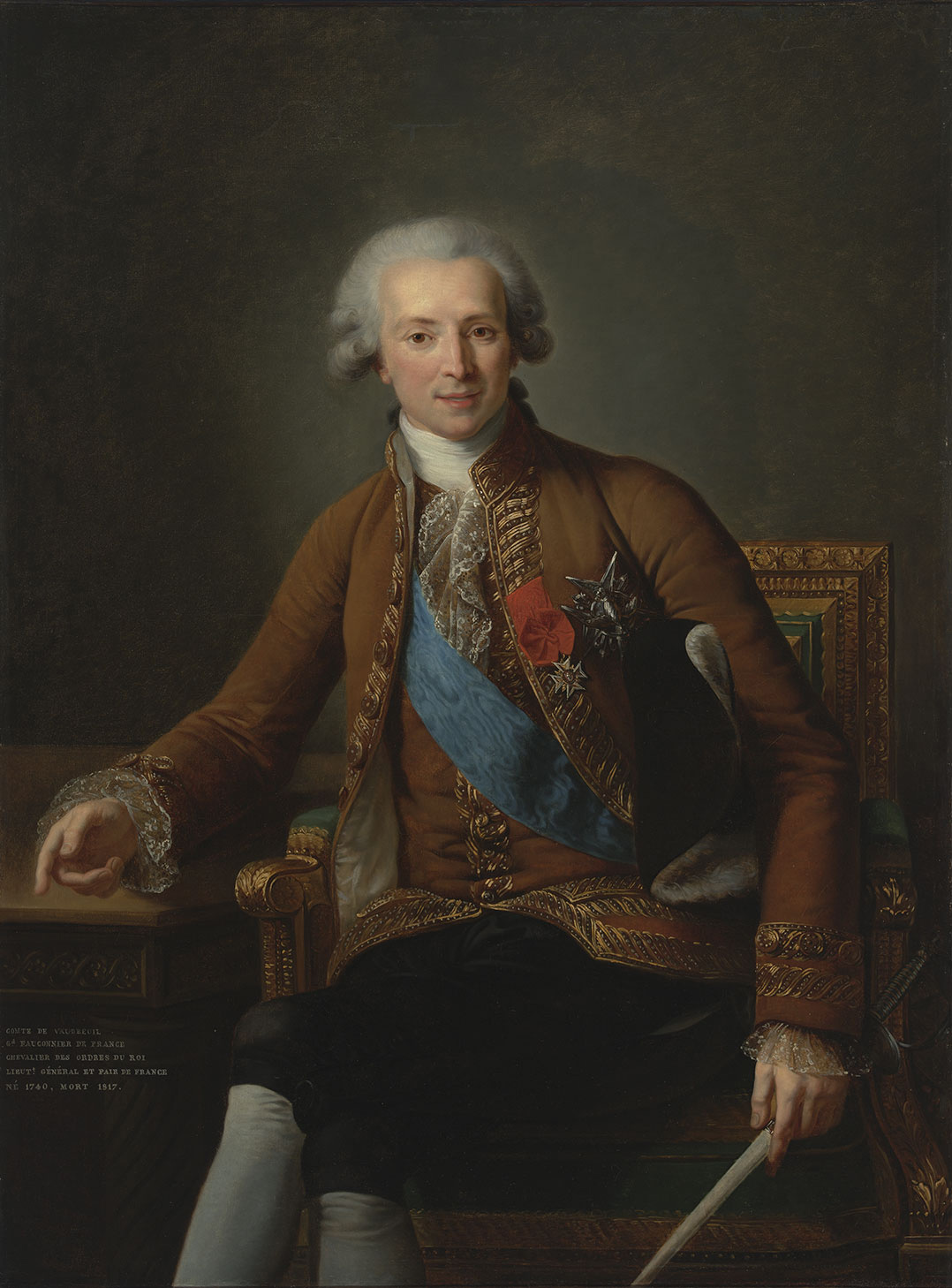
Élisabeth Vigée-Lebrun, Portrait of the Comte de Vaudreuil, 1784

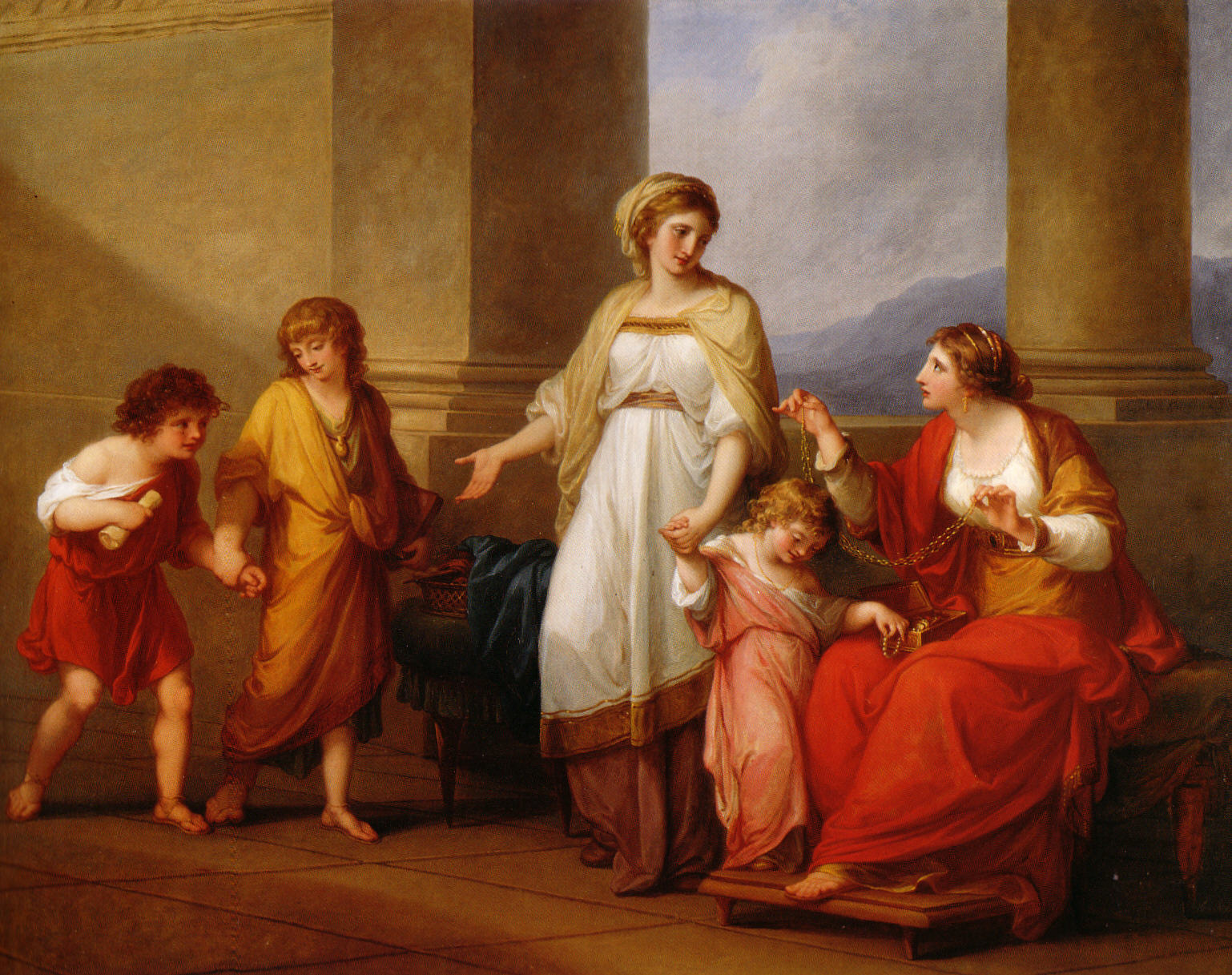
Angelica Kauffman, Cornelia, Mother of the Gracchi, 1785

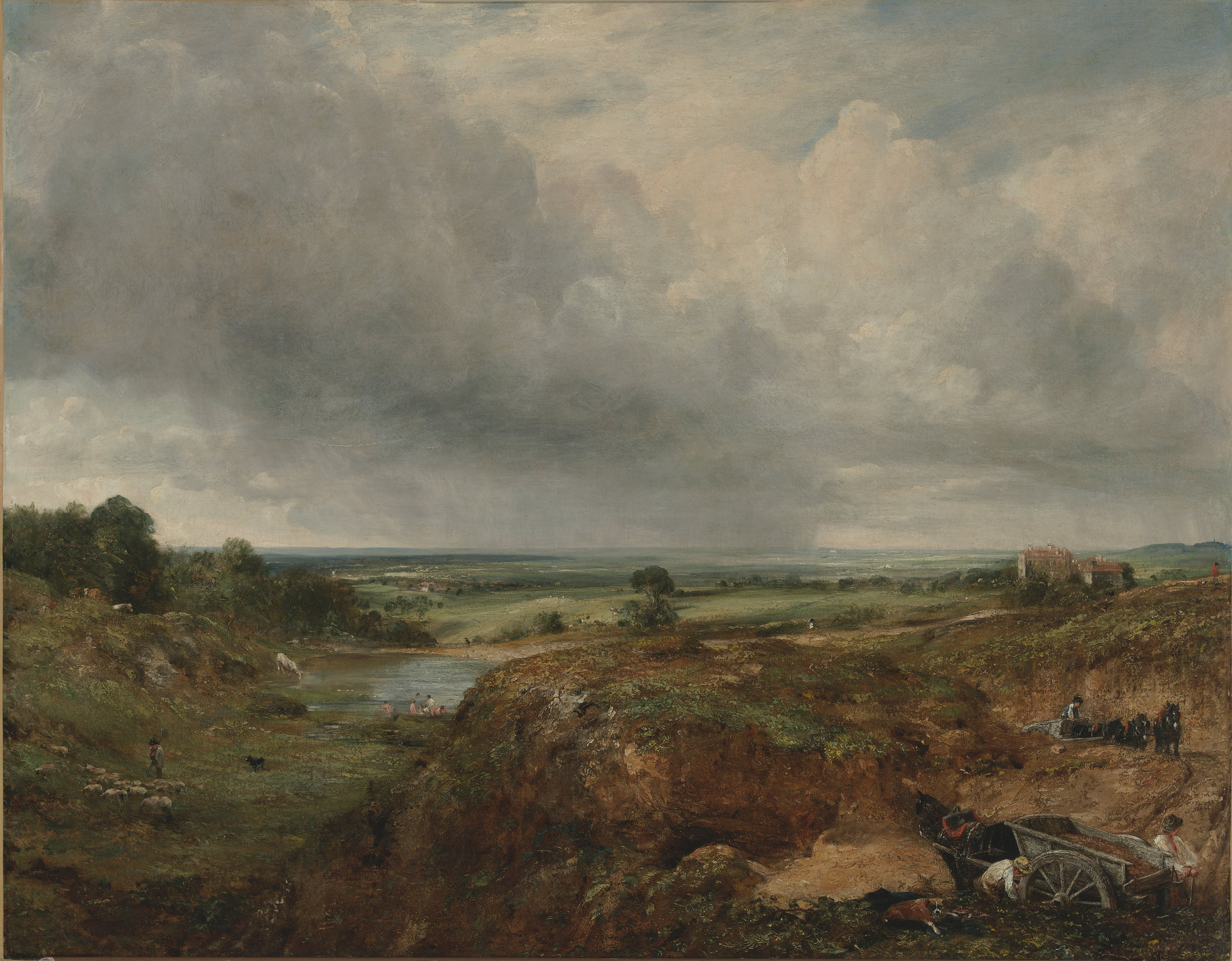
John Constable, Branch Hill Pond, Hampstead Heath, 1825

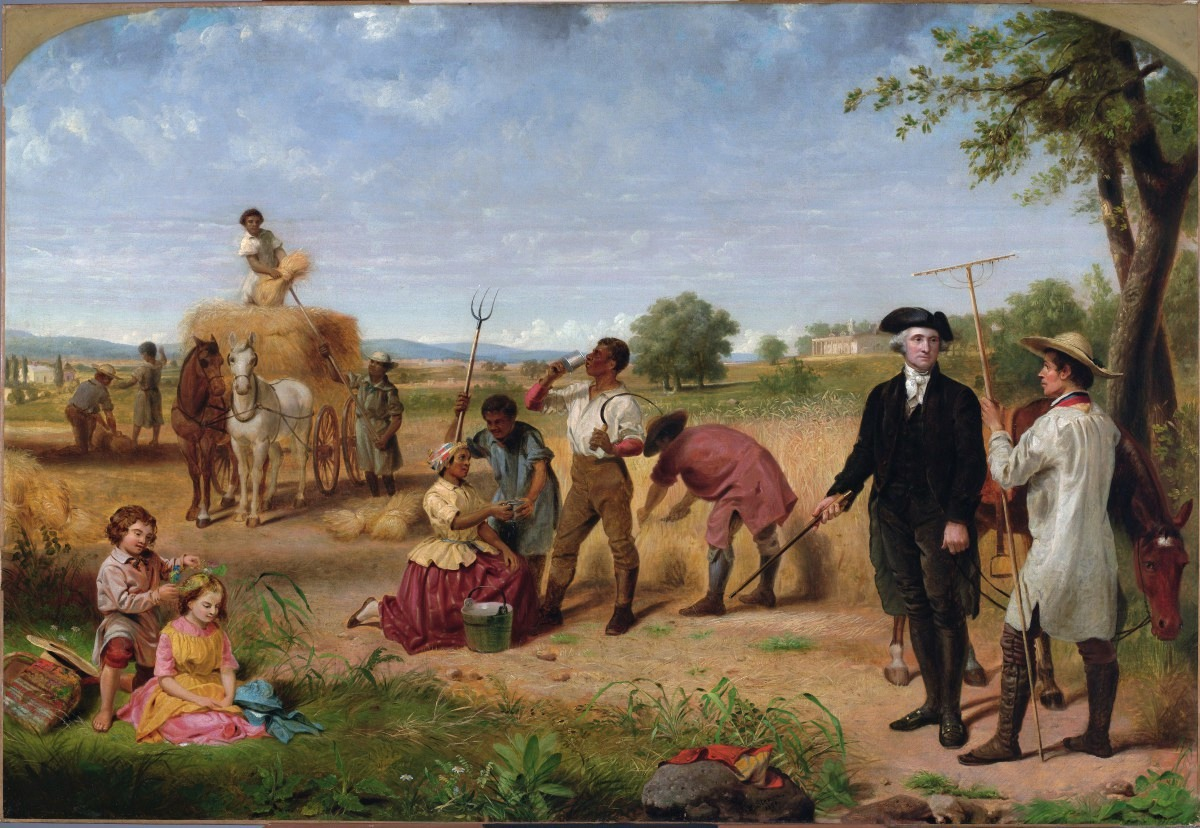
Junius Brutus Stearns, Washington as Farmer at Mount Vernon, 1851

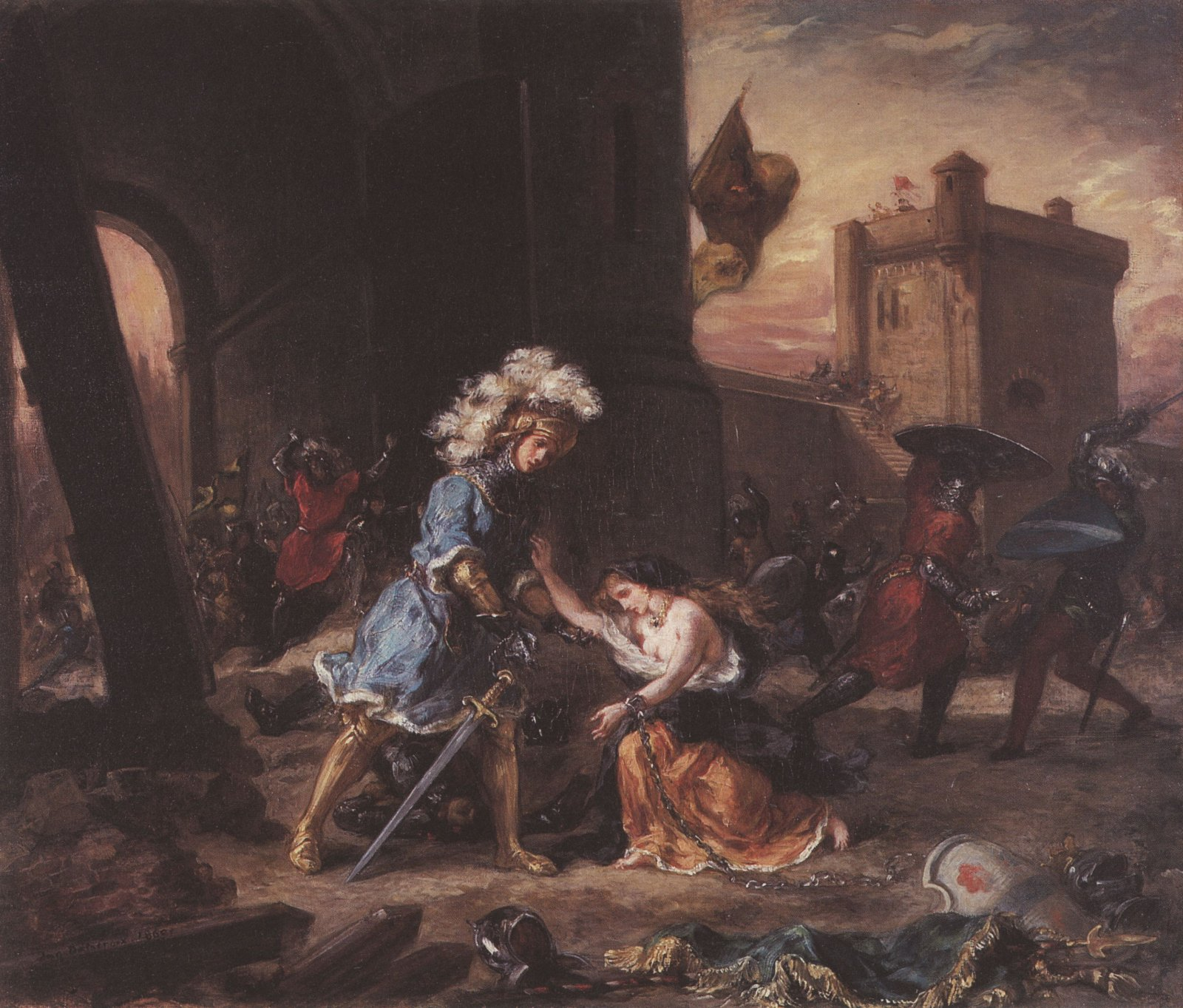
Eugène Delacroix, Amadis Delivers Princess Olga from Galpans Castle, 1860

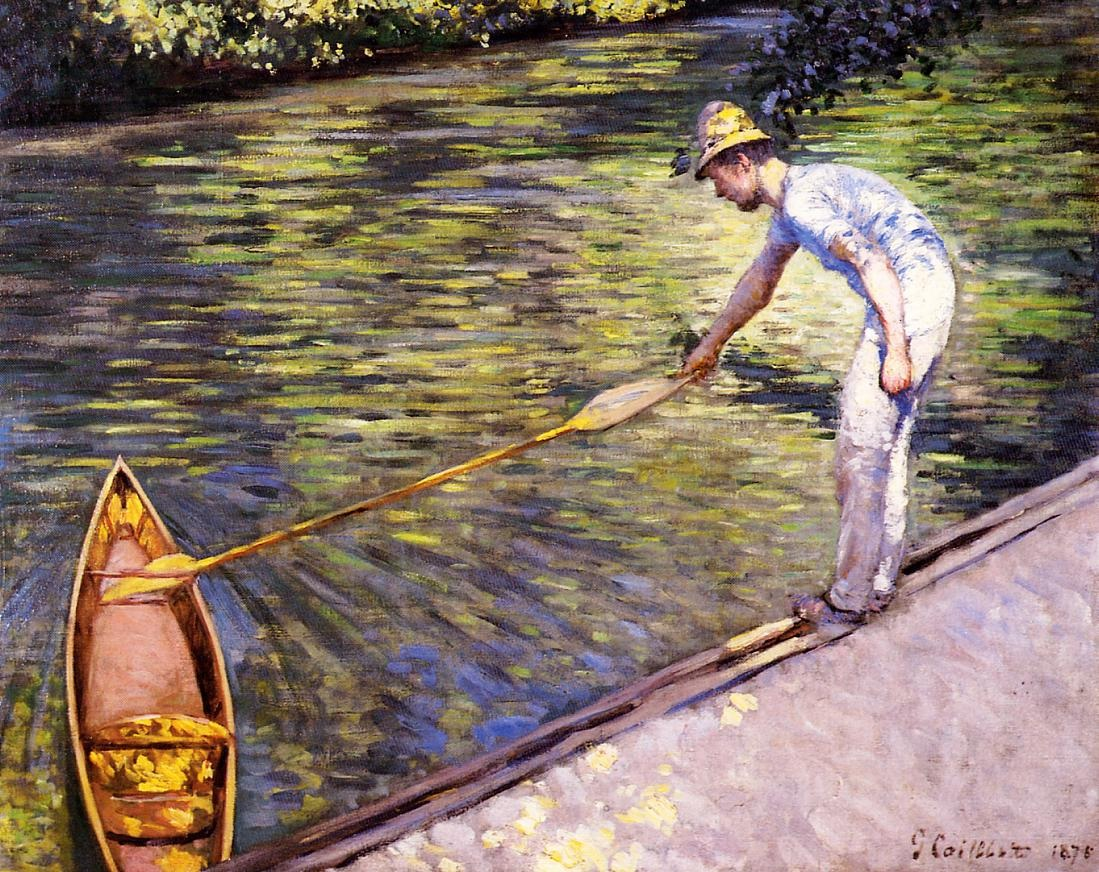
Gustave Caillebotte, Boater Docking His Skiff, 1878

Henri Rousseau, Tropical Landscape: American Indian Struggling with a Gorilla, 1910

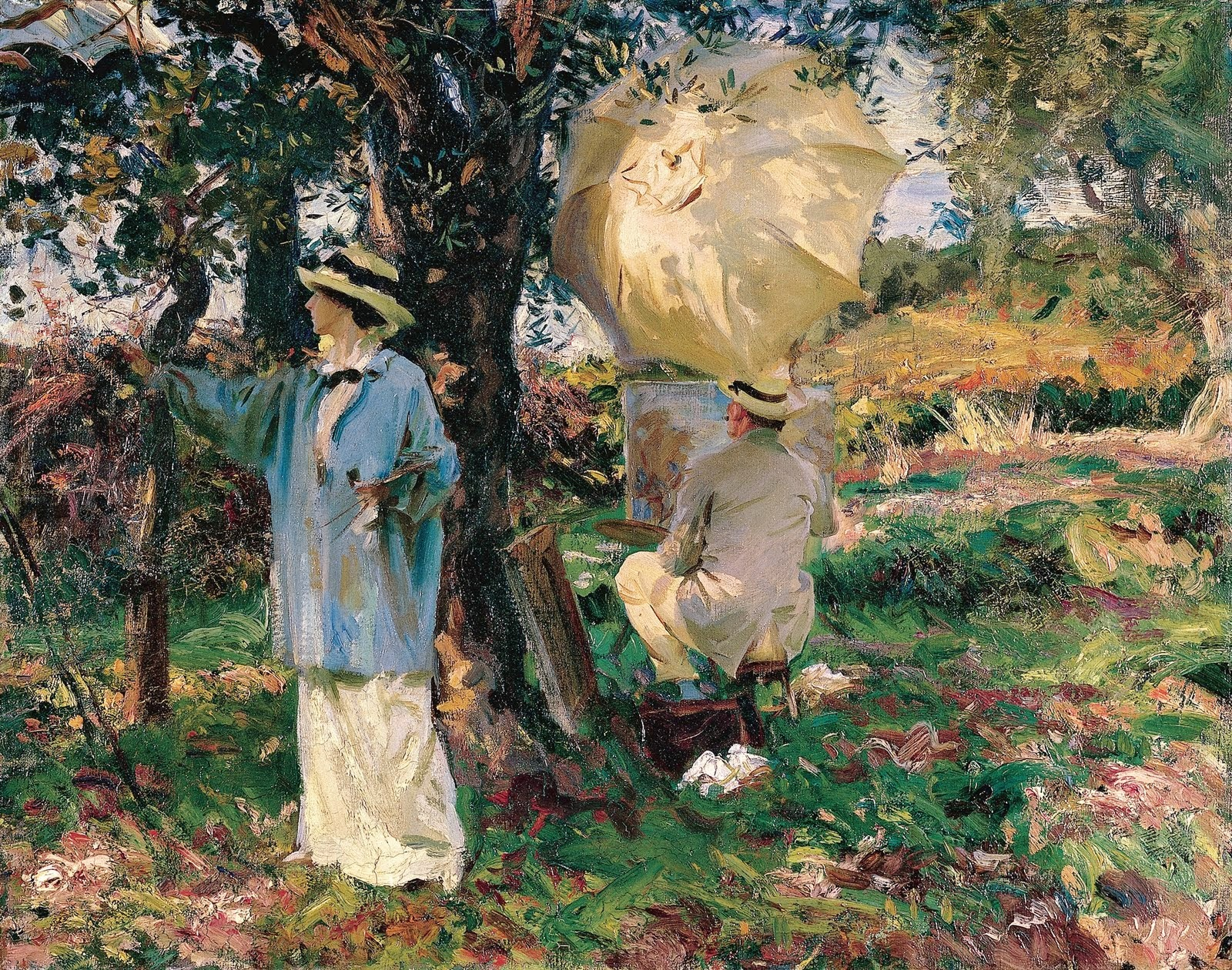
John Singer Sargent, The Sketchers, 1914.

== Special exhibitions ==
In addition to the galleries that display selections of the permanent collection, the Virginia Museum of Fine Arts presents special exhibitions of artwork drawn from its own and others' collections, as well as work of active artists.

In 1941, the museum presented an exhibition of Modernist works by artists of the School of Paris from the collection of Walter P. Chrysler Jr. (which later became the basis for the Chrysler Museum of Art).

In the 1950s, VMFA originated shows such as "Furniture of the Old South" (1952), "Design of Scandinavia" (1954) and "Masterpieces of Chinese Art" (1955). In the 1960s, there were "Masterpieces of American Silver", followed by "Painting in England, 1700–1850," which drew from the private collections of Mr. and Mrs. Paul Mellon. At the time, it was the most comprehensive exhibition of British painting ever presented in the United States. In 1967, the museum also mounted a major exhibition of the work of the English social satirist William Hogarth.

In 1978, the museum presented an exhibition on Colonial cabinetmaking in early Virginia, "Furniture of Williamsburg and Eastern Virginia, 1710–1790." Another first, and one that received widespread international attention, was the 1983 exhibition "Painting in the South: 1564–1980."

In the fall of 1996, VMFA was one of five major American museums to present "Fabergé in America" and "The Lillian Thomas Pratt Collection of Fabergé." These two exhibitions, featuring more than 400 objects and 15 imperial Easter eggs, drew more than 130,000 visitors to Richmond.

In 1997, the VMFA showed "William Blake: Illustrations of the Book of Job," an exhibition that featured a complete set of 21 engravings by English Romantic artist William Blake, created in 1825 and purchased by the museum in 1973. In addition to the engravings, the exhibit included six of the 1805 watercolors upon which Blake based them, on view and on loan from New York's Pierpont Morgan Library. Also on view were a complete set of the artist's preliminary drawings from the Fitzwilliam Museum at Cambridge University and the "New Zealand" set of copies of Blake's engravings from the Yale Center for British Art.

In 1999, the museum presented "Splendors of Ancient Egypt," an exhibition assembled from the renowned collection of the Pelizaeus Museum in Hildesheim, Germany. Nearly a quarter of a million people saw the show in Richmond. It was one of the largest exhibitions of Egyptian art ever to tour the United States.

In 2011, VMFA was one of seven museums worldwide chosen to exhibit one hundred seventy-six paintings from the personal collection of Pablo Picasso. The exhibit was held from February 19 – May 15, 2011 in ten galleries of the newly renovated museum. Director Alex Nyerges noted: "An exhibition this monumental is extremely rare, especially one that spans the entire career of a figure who many consider the most influential, innovative and creative artist of the 20th century." The collection of paintings was from a permanent collection housed in the Musée Picasso, then under renovation.

The VMFA is a member of the French Regional & American Museums Exchange (FRAME).

== Education and programs ==
The Office of Statewide Partnerships delivered programs and exhibitions throughout the commonwealth via a voluntary network of more than 350 nonprofit institutions (museums, galleries, art organizations, schools, community colleges, colleges and universities). Through this program, the museum offered crated exhibitions, arts-related audiovisual programs, symposia, lectures, conferences and workshops by visual and performing artists. The traveling artmobile program, tailored to help students meet the state's Standards of Learning, was also included.

VMFA has offered in-house educational programs that are supported by multiple specialized studios and on-site exhibition space. These have included courses in drawing, painting, sculpture, photography, fashion, digital arts, and mixed media.

Group highlights tours are offered daily. K-12 group tours are also offered, incorporating the Virginia Standards of Learning. All college student tours of VMFA's permanent collection — guided and self-directed — are free. Tours can be requested online.

VMFA's ARTshare is a multiyear digital initiative to expand the museum's digital outreach and make its collection more accessible.

VMFA established a Fellowship Program in 1940 which, by 2011, had delivered grants in excess of $5 million with 1,250 awards to Virginia artists since the program's inception. The fellowship funds come from a privately endowed fund administered by VMFA. The Fellowship Program was initially funded by the late John Lee Pratt of Fredericksburg (the husband of Lillian Pratt, donor of the museum's Fabergé collection). By 2011, fellowships were primarily funded through the Pratt endowment and supplemented by gifts from the Lettie Pate Whitehead Foundation and the J. Warwick McClintic Jr. Scholarship Fund. Notable recipients of VMFA fellowship grants include Vince Gilligan, Emmet Gowin, David Freed, Laura Pharis, Richard Carlyon, and Nell Blaine.

In 2004 VMFA deaccessed a Sixteenth Century French painting, Portrait of Jean d’Albon, which had been stolen from the Jewish Austrian collector Julius Priester by the Gestapo in 1944. Donated to the museum anonymously, it had been purchased by Newhouse Galleries in 1950 from Frederick Mont.
