= Rumors of War =

Statue

Coordinates: 37°33′23.8″N 77°28′26.4″W

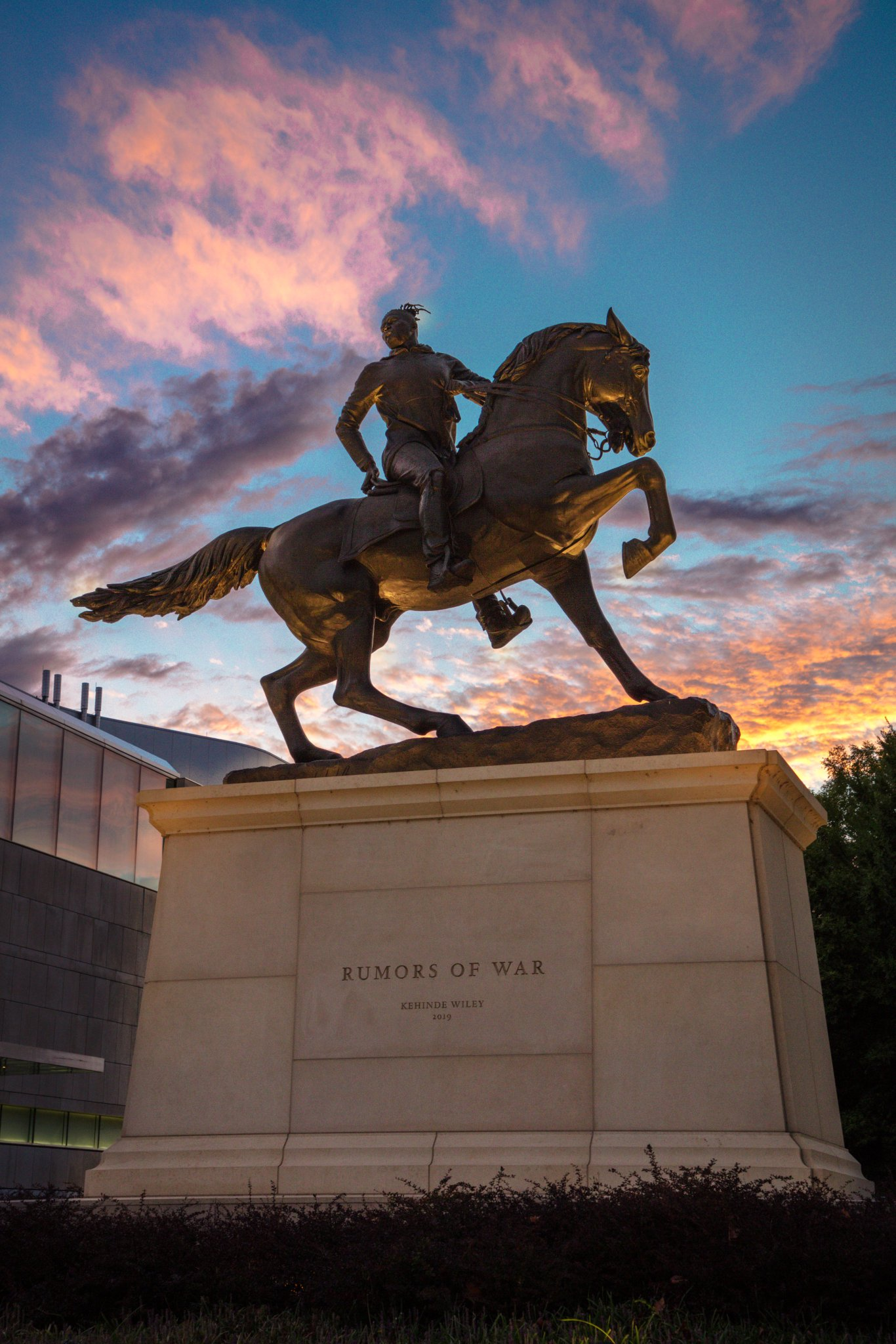
- Rumors of War two weeks after its unveiling at the Virginia Museum of Fine Arts in Richmond, Virginia in December 2019.
- Artist: Kehinde Wiley
- Year: 2019
- Medium: Bronze
- Dimensions: 27 feet (8.2 m) tall & 16 feet (4.9 m) long
- Location: Virginia Museum of Fine Arts, Richmond, Virginia, U.S.

Rumors of War is a series of artworks by Kehinde Wiley examining equestrian portraiture in the canon of Western art history culminating in a bronze monumental equestrian statue by the artist of an African-American young man (with dreadlocks in a ponytail, jeans ripped at the knees and Nike high-top sneakers). The statue was created as a response to the statue of Confederate General J.E.B. Stuart in Richmond, Virginia in particular and similar statues of high-ranking Confederate Army officers, some of which still stand in the United States despite persistent calls for their removal. Since the installation of Rumors of War in Richmond, all of the statues of the military leaders of the Confederacy have been removed from Monument Avenue where they had been since the first decade of the 20th century.

In September 2019 Wiley unveiled the work in Times Square in the borough of Manhattan in New York City with the backing of the Malcolm X Shabazz High School band from Newark, New Jersey. There it was displayed amidst a sea of electronic billboards. This project was produced in collaboration with Times Square Arts, Sean Kelly Gallery and UAP.

The work, which is Wiley's largest at 27 feet high and 16 feet wide, stood in Times Square from September 21, 2019 until December 1, 2019. The work then traveled to its permanent home at the Virginia Museum of Fine Arts in Richmond, on Arthur Ashe Boulevard, where it is situated directly next to the headquarters of the United Daughters of the Confederacy and near where once were located a volley of Confederate statues and monuments that populated the city's Monument Avenue. It is the most expensive commission in the history of the museum. The statue was unveiled a second time in Richmond on December 10, 2019.

Wiley first employed the title "Rumors of War" in 2006 for a series of four large paintings which examine European equestrian portraiture and were premiered at the Deitch Projects gallery in New York City. It has also been pointed out that Wiley in titling the work may have been citing a biblical passage from Matthew 24 ... "Ye shall hear of wars and rumours of wars: see that ye be not troubled: for all these things must come to pass, but the end is not yet. For nation shall rise against nation, and kingdom against kingdom: and there shall be famines, and pestilences, and earthquakes, in diverse places. All these are the beginning of sorrows. Then shall they deliver you up to be afflicted, and shall kill you: and ye shall be hated of all nations for my name's sake"... The bronze statue is placed upon a limestone pedestal into which the titular phrase is inscribed.
