= Patriotic Society (Russia) =

Russian charity organization for women

The Patriotic Society (Russian: Патриотическое общество) was a charity organisation for women, active in Russia from 1812 to 1917. It was the first and most notable women's organisation in Imperial Russia.

== See also ==
- Women's Patriotic Institute, girls' school founded by the society
