= Alex Nyerges =

American artist and arts administrator

Alex Nyerges (born 1957) was named director of the Virginia Museum of Fine Arts in 2006, becoming the museum's eighth person to fill that post. He was also director and CEO at the Dayton Art Institute from 1992 to 2006, as well as the executive director of the Mississippi Museum of Art in Jackson, Mississippi and the DeLand Museum of Art in Deland, Florida. Nyerges is active as a photographer, curator, author, and photo historian, and his photography has been exhibited in the United States and abroad.

== Early life and education ==
Nyerges was born Alexander Lee Nyerges in Rochester, New York in 1957. He attended George Washington University, where he earned an undergraduate degree with a double major in anthropology and archaeology and a master's degree in museum studies.

== Career ==
Nyerges began his career wanting to be an archeologist, and his work as a photographer followed his interest in archaeology.

He was the executive director of the Mississippi Museum of Art in Jackson, Mississippi and the DeLand Museum of Art in Florida. In 1992, he became the director and CEO of Dayton Art Institute, a position he held until 2006.

=== Virginia Museum of Fine Arts ===
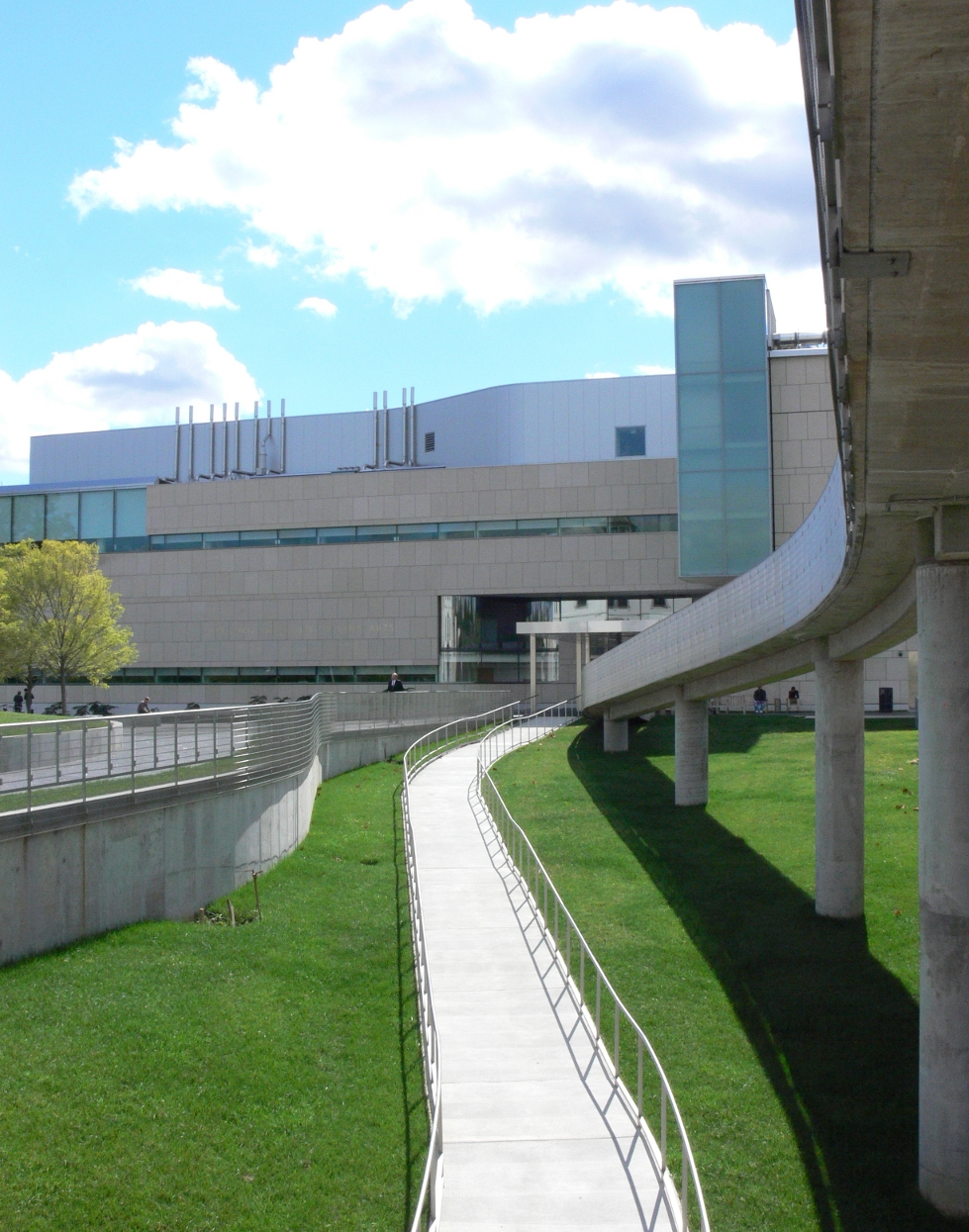
Virginia Museum of Fine Arts - entrance Fall 2010

Nyerges was appointed the director of Virginia Museum of Fine Arts (VMFA) in 2006. At the beginning of his newly acquired post, extensive renovations were made to the VMFA, and he oversaw the construction which was completed in 2010.

He has organized a number of notable exhibitions as director, such as the Picasso exhibition in 2010 that broke all previous attendance records for the VMFA and brought in an estimated 30 million dollars in local tourist revenue for the museum. In 2012 a major gift to the museum was acquired, elevating the museum into the top ranks of major American museum.

Other major exhibitions include a major retrospective on Kehinde Wiley, Kehinde Wiley: A New Republic, accompanied by a lecture by the artist at the museum. In 2018, the Terracotta Army archaeological exhibition featuring clay sculpture life-size portraits from the reign of the first Chinese emperor Qin Shi Huang was held at the VMFA, curated by the museum's Asian specialist Li Jian.

Nyerges has improved accessibility to the museum and its collections, an effort emphasized in the museum's motto, "It's your art, Virginia." Nyerges was honored in 2015 as a top-10 Person of the Year by the Richmond Times-Dispatch for increasing the popularity and accessibility of the museum. In 2017, Style Magazine placed Nyerges on the "2017 Power List for Arts and Culture" for increasing the diversity of its collection and staff, and overseeing an improved public perception of the museum.

== Personal life ==
Nyerges' wife, Kathryn Gray, a former musician and performing arts manager, is an artist who maintains a studio at the Visual Arts Center of Richmond. They have a son, Robert Nyerges, who is a filmmaker in Los Angeles.

The French Ministry of Culture awarded Alex Nyerges the title "Knight in the Order of Arts and Letters" (Chevalier de l'ordre des Arts et des Lettres) for his contributions to French and American culture.
