= Women's Patriotic Institute =

Girls' school in Saint Petersburg

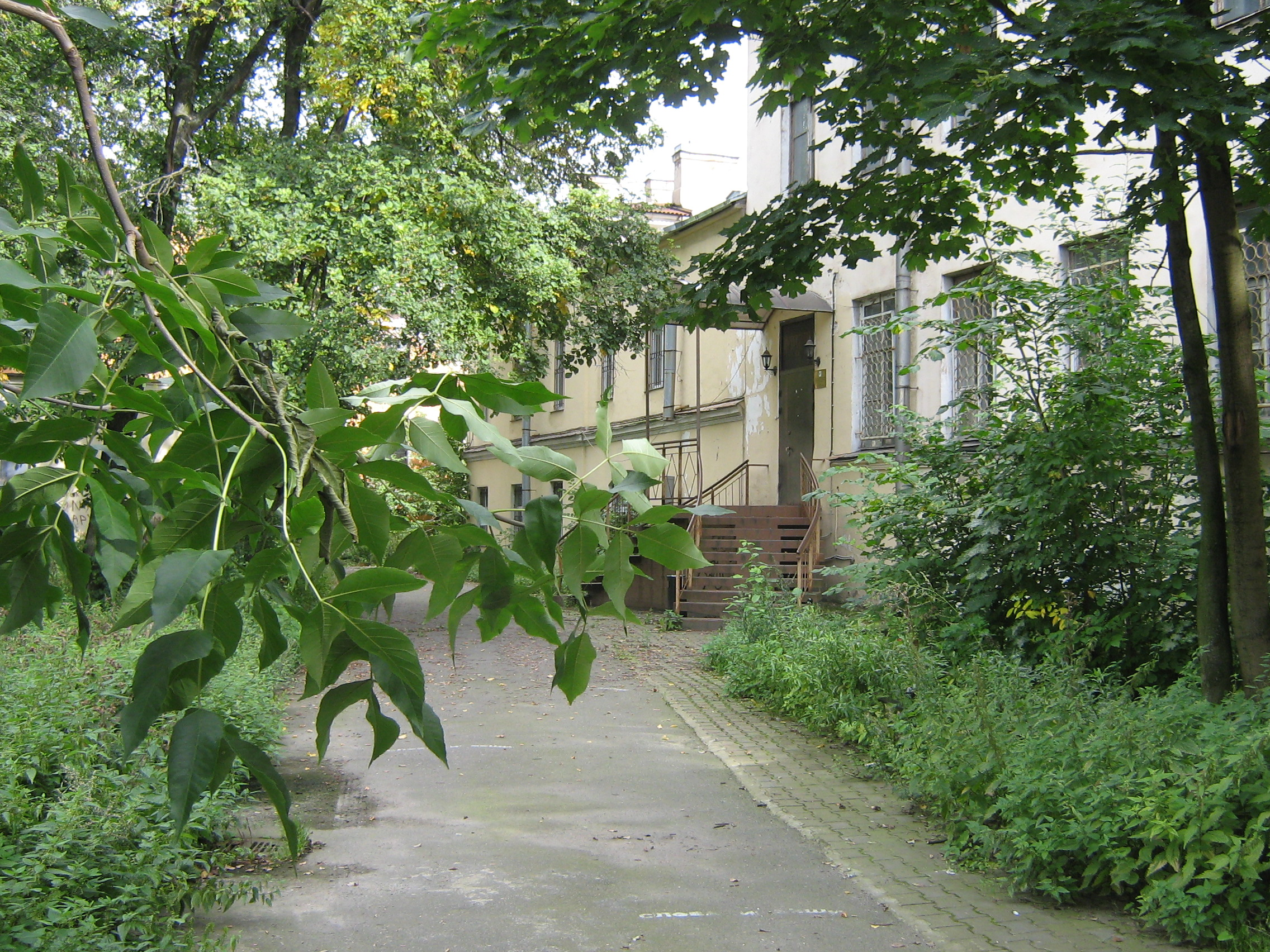
Sankt-Peterburg 2012 4647

The Women's Patriotic Institute (Russian: Патриотический институт) was a girls' school in Saint Petersburg in Russia between 1822 and 1918. It was a charity school, founded by the Patriotic Society. Originally a charity school with the purpose of educating the orphan daughters of officers who died during the French invasion of Russia, it gradually developed into a fashionable girl school.
