= Peter the Great (Fabergé egg) =

1903 Imperial Fabergé egg

Peter the Great Fabergé egg
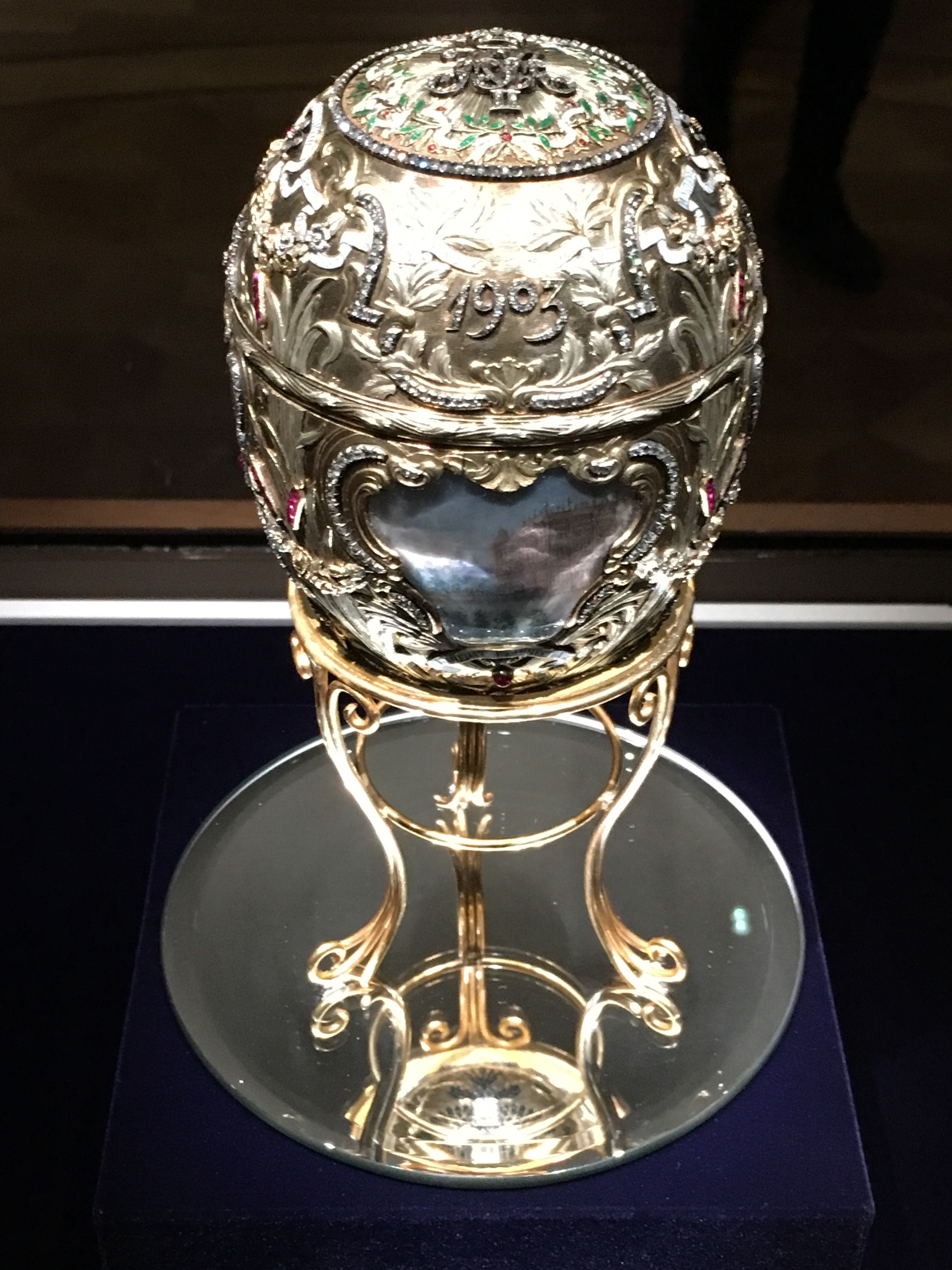
- The egg on its original stand
- Year delivered: 1903
- Customer: Nicholas II
- Recipient: Alexandra Fedorovna

Current owner
- Individual or institution: Virginia Museum of Fine Arts
- Year of acquisition: 1947

Design and materials
- Workmaster: Michael Perkhin
- Materials used: Gold, diamond, platinum, rock crystal, enamel
- Height: 111 millimetres (4.4 in)
- Surprise: Miniature gold replica of Peter the Great equestrian statue

The Peter the Great egg is a jewelled Easter egg made under the supervision of the Russian jeweler Peter Carl Fabergé in 1903 for the last Tsar of Russia, Nicholas II. Tsar Nicholas presented the Fabergé egg to his wife, the Czarina Alexandra Fyodorovna. The egg is now in the Virginia Museum of Fine Arts in Richmond, Virginia, in the United States.

== Design ==
Made in the Rococo style, the Peter the Great Egg celebrated the two-hundredth anniversary of the founding of St. Petersburg in 1703. It is made of red, green and yellow gold, platinum, rose-cut diamonds, rubies, enamel, rock crystal, and miniature watercolor portraits on ivory. The egg measures 4 1/4 by 3 1/8 (diameter) inches.

Executed in gold, the curves are set with diamonds and rubies. The body of the egg is covered in laurel leaves and bulrushes that are chased in 14-carat green gold. These symbolize the source of the "living waters". The spiky heads are set with square rubies. White enamel ribbons inscribed with historical details encircle the egg. On the top of the egg is an enameled wreath which encircles Nicholas II's monogram. The bottom of the egg is adorned with the double-headed imperial eagle, made of black enamel and crowned with two diamonds.

The egg shell features four miniature watercolors painted by B. Byalz. The paintings representing the "before" and "after" of St. Petersburg in 1703 and 1903. The front painting features the extravagant Winter Palace, the official residence of Nicholas II two hundred years after the founding of St. Petersburg. Opposite this, on the back of the egg, is a painting of the log cabin believed to be built by Peter the Great himself, representative of the founding of St. Petersburg on the banks of the Neva River. On the sides of the egg are portraits of Peter the Great in 1703 and Nicholas II in 1903. Each of the miniatures is covered by rock crystal. The dates 1703 and 1903, worked in diamonds, appear on either side of the lid above the paintings of the log cabin and Winter Palace, respectively.

Below each painting are fluttering enamel ribbons with inscriptions in black Cyrillic letters. The inscriptions include: "The Emperor Peter the Great, born in 1672, founding St. Petersburg in 1703", "The first little house of the Emperor Peter the Great]in 1703", "The Emperor Nicholas II born in the 1868 ascended the throne in 1894" and "The Winter Palace of His Imperial Majesty in 1903."

The design of the piece is based on an egg-shaped gold and enamel clock nécessaire made in Paris in 1757 for the Tsarina Elizabeth, which is in the collection of the Hermitage Museum.

== Surprise ==
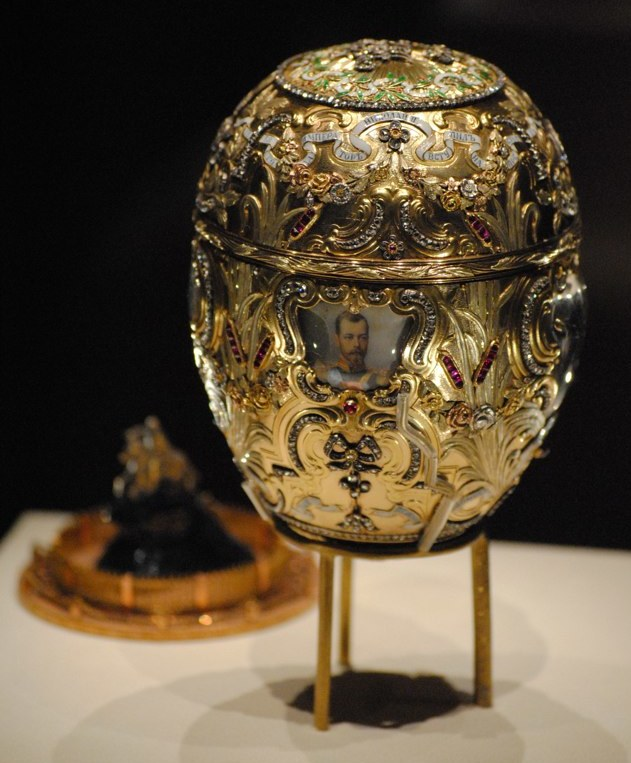
Surprise in the background

The surprise is that when the egg is opened, a mechanism within raises a miniature gold model of Peter the Great's monument on the Neva, resting on a base of red granite. The model was made by Gerogii Malychevin. The reason for this choice of surprise is the story of a legend from the 19th century that says enemy forces will never take St. Petersburg while the "Bronze Horseman" stands in the middle of the city.

== History ==
St. Petersburg was founded by Peter the Great in 1703 during the Great Northern War. Peter moved the Russian capital from Moscow to St. Petersburg and intended the new city to be a "window on the west," in an effort to Westernize Russia. St. Petersburg became a European cultural center and continues to be the most westernized city in Russia.

The Peter the Great Egg was sold in 1930 to Armand Hammer, an American entrepreneur who had business interests in Russia. It was later bought by A la Vieille Russie, New York City. In 1944, it was purchased by Lillian Pratt of Fredericksburg, Virginia (1876–1947) and bequeathed to the Virginia Museum of Fine Arts in 1947. It remains on permanent view in their European Decorative Art Collection.

== See also ==
- Egg decorating

== Sources ==
- Faber, Toby (2008). Faberge's Eggs: The Extraordinary Story of the Masterpieces That Outlived an Empire. Random House. ISBN 978-1-4000-6550-9.
- Forbes, Christopher; Prinz von Hohenzollern, Johann Georg (1990). FABERGE; The Imperial Eggs. Prestel. ASIN B000YA9GOM.
- Lowes, Will (2001). Fabergé Eggs: A Retrospective Encyclopedia. Scarecrow Press. ISBN 0-8108-3946-6.
- Snowman, A Kenneth (1988). Carl Faberge: Goldsmith to the Imperial Court of Russia. Gramercy. ISBN 0-517-40502-4.
