= Antikvariat =

Organization of the Russian Revolution

Antikvariat (Russian: Антиквариат) was a Russian department of the Ministry of Trade set up by Lenin in 1921 following the Russian Revolution to handle the sale and export of art pieces acquired by the revolutionary government from Russian museums such as the Hermitage and Gatchina Palace, from Russian churches, and from Russian elites who either had been forced to surrender them to the new government, had fled the country without them, or were executed during the revolution. Among these state treasures were 30 of the 40 Fabergé eggs that had been held by the Moscow Armory following the abdication of the last Russian tsar, Nicholas II.

The new government of Russia began its existence in dire financial straits. Lenin and later Stalin needed money as quickly as possible, and the liquidation of Russian art works was believed to be one way to accomplish this. Antikvariat's members were not curators or art specialists but members of the Communist Party selected by other Party members to extract as much money as possible from the sale of Russian art to Western businessmen and diplomats. Russian art historians in charge of holding these works thwarted their attempts, and sometimes disguised or hid works that Antikvariat, had it known of their existence, would have preferred to have sold. For this, many of those passionate to retain these works were arrested, tried, and executed.
