= Diamond Trellis (Fabergé egg) =

1892 Imperial Fabergé egg

Diamond Trellis Fabergé egg
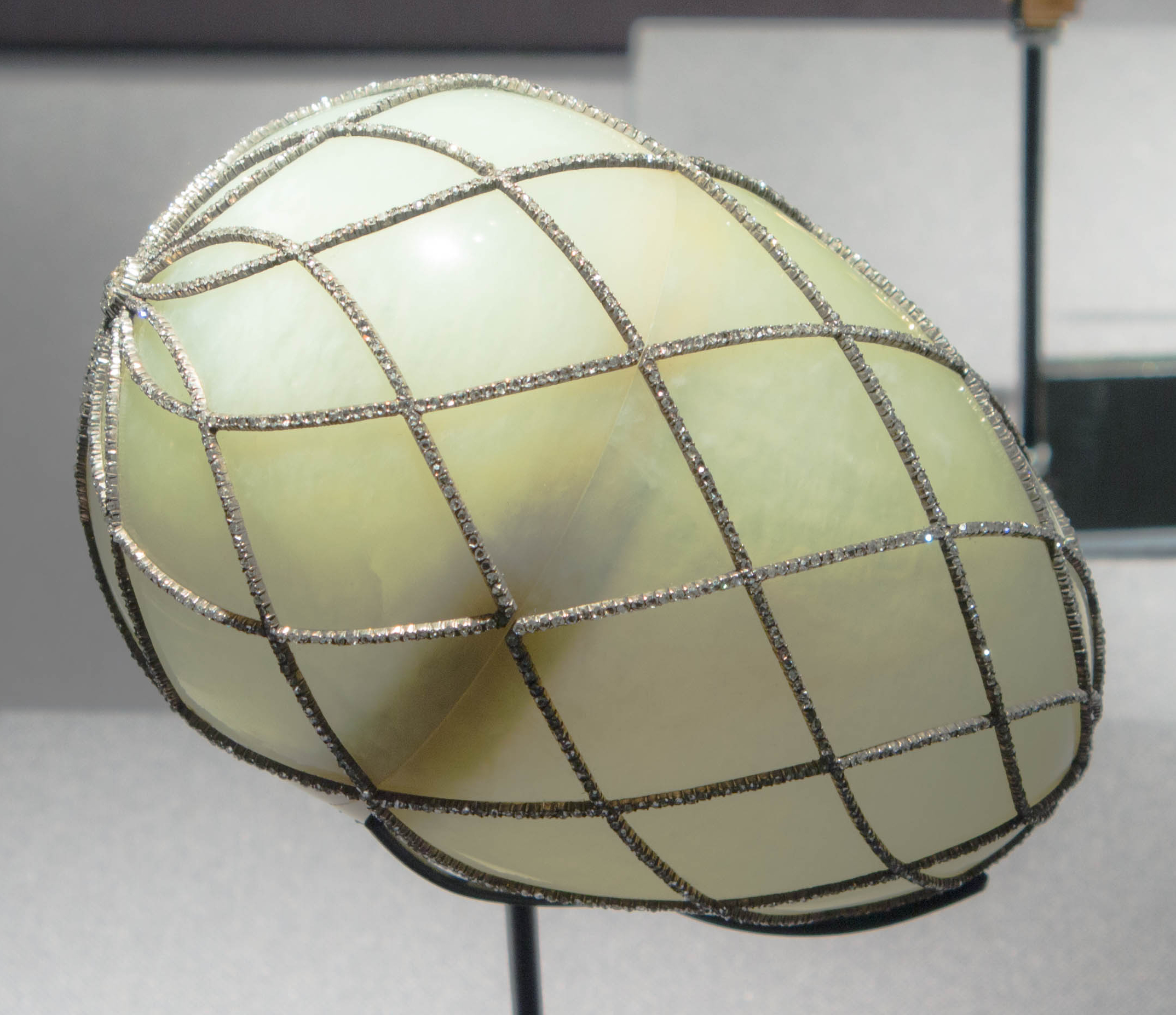
- Year delivered: 1892
- Customer: Alexander III
- Recipient: Maria Feodorovna

Current owner
- Individual or institution: Dorothy McFerrin

Design and materials
- Workmaster: August Holmström
- Materials used: Gold, jadeite, rose-cut diamonds
- Height: 108 mm (4 1/4 in.)
- Surprise: Ivory elephant automaton

The Diamond Trellis egg is a jewelled enamelled Easter egg made by August Holmström under the supervision of the Russian jeweller Peter Carl Fabergé in 1892. It is one of the Imperial Fabergé eggs, made for Alexander III of Russia, who presented it to his wife, the Empress Maria Feodorovna. The egg is owned by Dorothy McFerrin, as part of the collection acquired by her and her husband, Artie McFerrin, who died on August 8, 2017, and is on display at the Houston Museum of Natural Science.

The egg cost 4,750 silver roubles, and contained an automaton of an ivory elephant covered with precious stones. The surprise, thought missing for many years, was identified in 2015 in the collection of the British Royal Family.

== Design ==
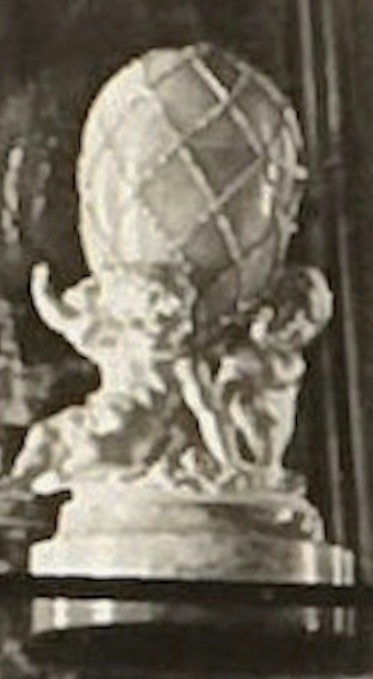
Detail of a 1902 photo showing the egg's original base. Whereabouts unknown.

The egg is made of bowenite, gold, rose-cut diamonds, and, originally, was lined with white satin. It is carved from bowenite and is enclosed in a lattice of rose-cut diamonds with gold mounts. The egg is hinged, and a large diamond sits at its base.

Originally, the egg was supported on three silver putti, seated on a grassy mound with roses on a circular bowenite base. The putti are said to represent the three sons of the imperial couple, the Grand Dukes Nicholas, George and Michael. The pedestal is either lost or survives elsewhere. The pedestal, but not the surprise, was still with the egg when it was sold by Sotheby’s London, on 5 December 1960. Subsequently, the base was separated from the egg by Emanuel Snowman of Wartski in the mistaken belief that this was a later addition.

== Surprise ==
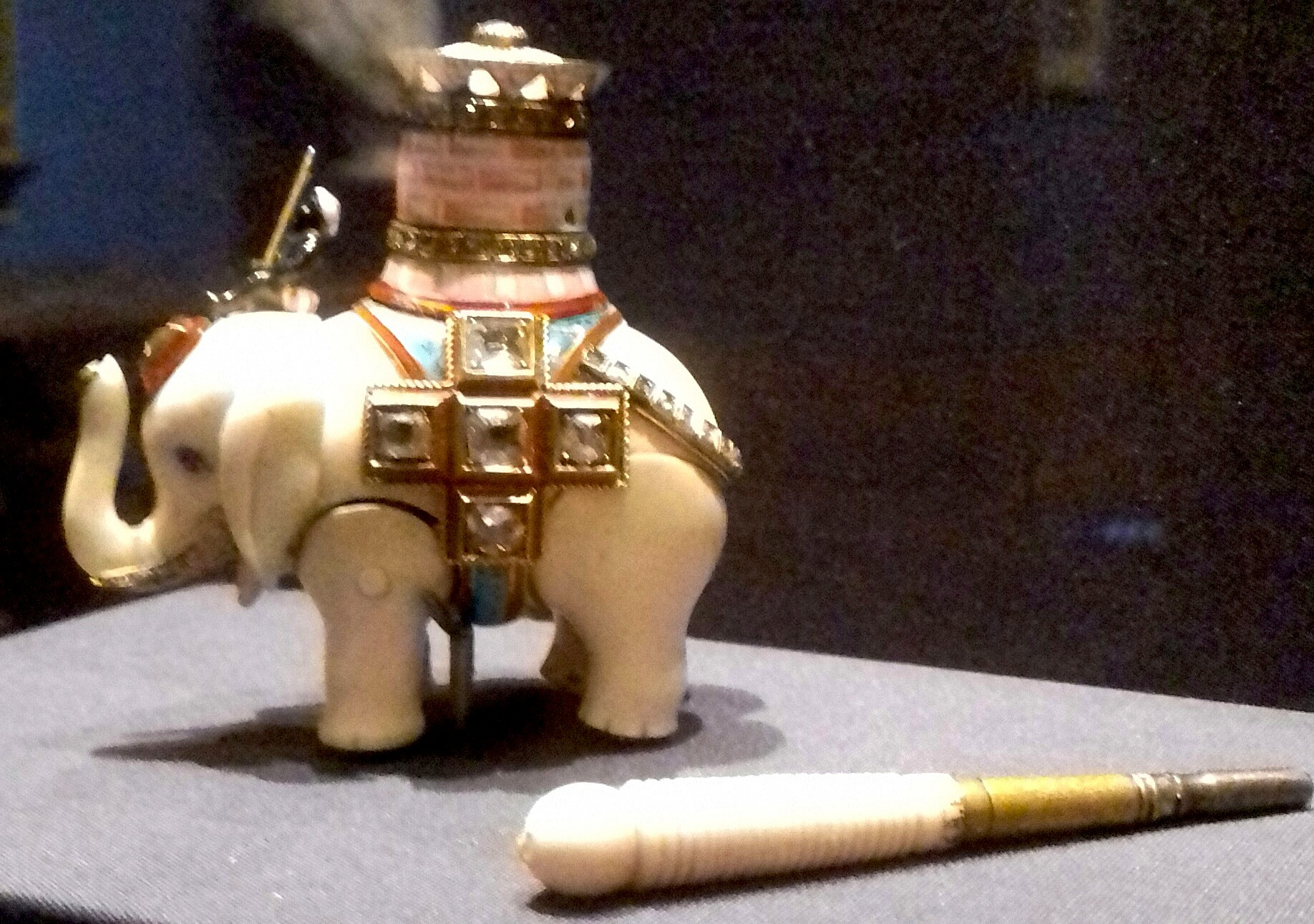
Automaton elephant and winding key. Apart from temporary exhibitions, the egg and its surprise are not displayed together as both items belong to different collections.

The surprise was an automaton of an elephant in ivory. It was the first automaton made by Fabergé for an Imperial egg, his next automaton was made in 1900 for the Pine Cone egg presented to Barbara Kelch. The surprise was described in detail when the egg was held at the Gatchina Palace. A small key wound the ivory elephant which had a small gold tower on its back decorated with rose-cut diamonds. The sides of the elephant were decorated with gold and five precious stones. The tusks, trunk and harness were decorated with small diamonds, and a black mahout sat on its head. The elephant had special significance; the design resembles the badge of the highest order in Denmark, Empress Maria Feodorovna's homeland. It was likely sold by the Soviets at the same time as its egg, and may have been resold by Wartski. It was recorded as missing, but had been purchased by George V and was residing in a cabinet in Buckingham Palace, where in 2015 it was identified as Fabergé and the lost surprise by Royal Collection Trust senior curator Caroline de Guitaut.

The surprise and the egg were placed on display together for the first time at the Houston Museum of Natural Sciences in 2017 since the identification of the surprise where the surprise was loaned by the Royal Collection for a year.

== Ownership ==
The egg was presented to the Empress Maria Feodorovna by her husband, Alexander III of Russia on 5 April 1892, and was subsequently held at the Gatchina Palace. It was one of 40 eggs sent to the Kremlin Armoury by the Russian Provisional Government for safekeeping in September 1917. It was transferred to the Council of People's Commissars in 1922, and around 1927 was sold by the Antikvariat to Michel Norman of the Australian Pearl Company. Subsequently purchased by Emanuel Snowman of the London jewellers, Wartski, it was bought from Wartski by a Mr. T. B. Kitson in October 1929. Following Kitson's death it was auctioned by Sotheby's in December 1962 for £2,400, and bought by a buyer's agent, named Drager. The egg was subsequently owned by a private collection in the United Kingdom from 1962 to 1977, and was held by a private collection in London in 1983.

The Diamond Trellis egg is currently owned by Dorothy McFerrin, the widower to successful businessman in the Houston chemical and petroleum industry Artie McFerrin, who has collected one of the largest private collections of Fabergé objet d'art in the United States. As well as the Diamond Trellis egg, McFerrin owns Fabergé eggs made for the Russian nobleman Alexander Kelch, and the Swedish-Russian oil baron Emanuel Nobel.

The Diamond Trellis egg was exhibited at London's Victoria and Albert Museum in 1977, the Museum of Applied Arts in Helsinki in 1980, New York's Cooper-Hewitt Museum in 1983 and the Swedish Nationalmuseum in Stockholm in 1997.

== See also ==
- Egg decorating

== Sources ==
- Faber, Toby (2008). Faberge's Eggs: The Extraordinary Story of the Masterpieces That Outlived an Empire. Random House. ISBN 978-1-4000-6550-9.
- Forbes, Christopher; Prinz von Hohenzollern, Johann Georg (1990). FABERGE; The Imperial Eggs. Prestel. ASIN B000YA9GOM.
- Lowes, Will (2001). Fabergé Eggs: A Retrospective Encyclopedia. Scarecrow Press. ISBN 0-8108-3946-6.
- Snowman, A Kenneth (1988). Carl Faberge: Goldsmith to the Imperial Court of Russia. Gramercy. ISBN 0-517-40502-4.
