= Colonnade (Fabergé egg) =

1910 Imperial Fabergé egg

Colonnade Fabergé egg
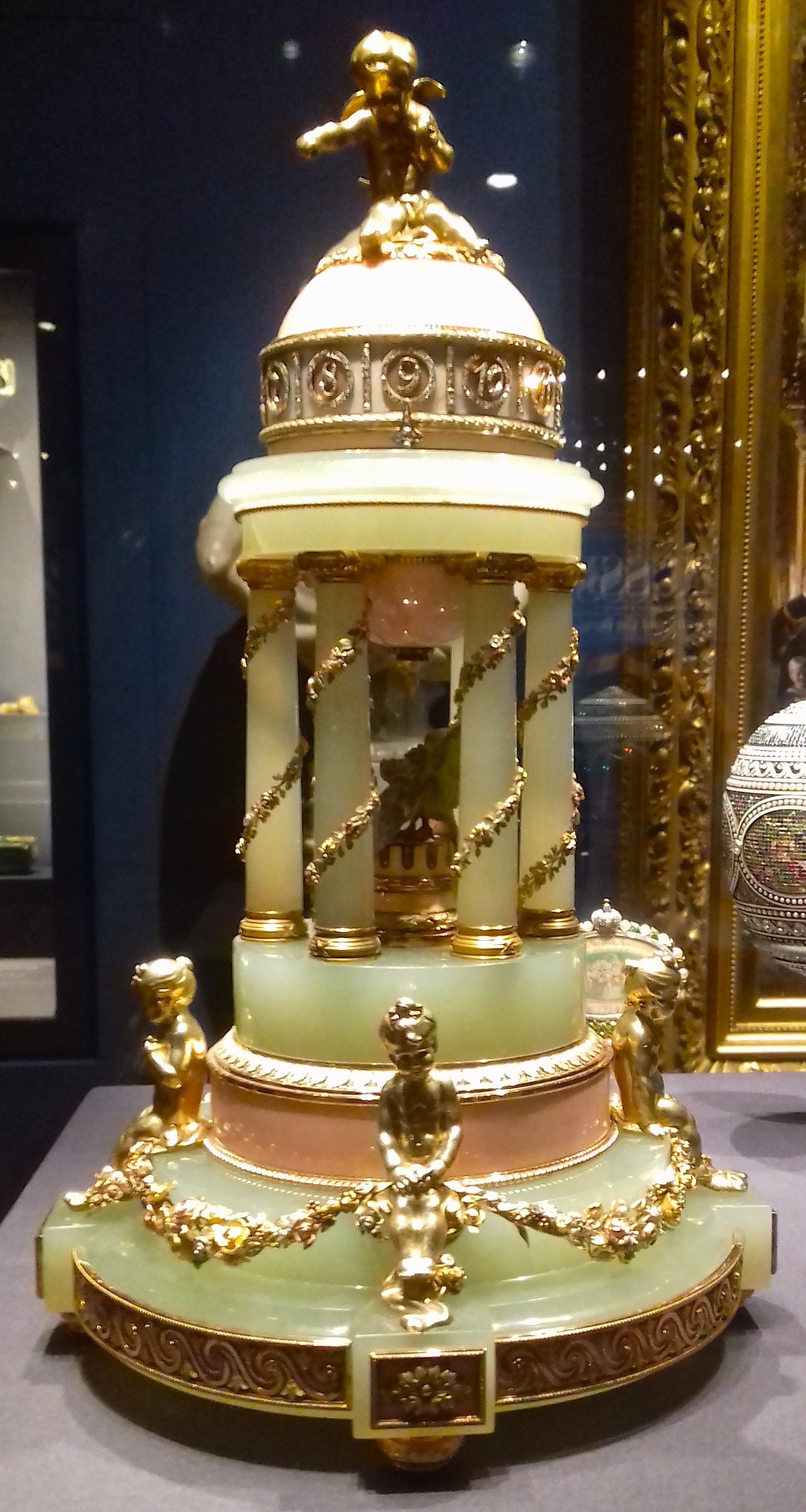
- Year delivered: 1910
- Customer: Nicholas II
- Recipient: Alexandra Feodorovna

Current owner
- Individual or institution: King Charles III
- Year of acquisition: 2022, inherited from Elizabeth II

Design and materials
- Workmaster: Henrik Wigström
- Materials used: Bowenite, gold, silver-gilt, platinum, guilloché enamel, diamond
- Height: 280 millimetres (11 in)
- Width: 170 millimetres (6.7 in) diameter
- Surprise: No surprise (clock-egg)

The Colonnade egg is a jewelled enameled Easter egg made by Henrik Wigström under the supervision of the Russian jeweller Peter Carl Fabergé in 1910. The Fabergé egg was made for Nicholas II of Russia, who presented it to his wife, Alexandra Feodorovna to celebrate the birth of their only son, the tsarevich Alexei. As a clock-egg, the Colonnade egg contained no surprise.

== Design ==
The Colonnade egg is made of Bowenite, four-colour gold, silver-gilt, platinum, guilloché enamel and rose diamonds. It is one of only four Faberge Easter Eggs to include a clock in the design. The Colonnade Egg features a rotary clock made by the Swiss firm Henry Moser & Cie.

The egg symbolizes a temple of love. A pair of platinum doves represent the love of Nicholas and Alexandra. Four silver-gilt cherubs sit around the base of the egg, each representing Nicholas and Alexandra's four daughters: Anastasia, Olga, Maria, and Tatiana. Alexei is represented by a silver-gilt cupid, which surmounts the egg.

== History ==
Purchased for 11,600 roubles the Colonnade Egg was presented to Alexandra at Eastertide 1910 to celebrate the 1904 birth of Alexei, the fifth child and only son of Nicholas and Alexandra. After giving birth to four daughters, the birth of their first and only son was significant because it ensured a direct heir to the throne, rather than succession passing to Grand Duke Michael Alexandrovich of Russia, the younger brother of Nicholas II.

Upon the abdication of Nicholas II and the imprisonment of the family in 1917, the Colonnade Egg was confiscated by the provisional government. It then appears on a 1922 list of confiscated treasures moved from the Anichkov Palace to the Sovnarkom, which was a state-run organization which collected and conserved treasures. In 1927 the Colonnade Egg was sold as one of nine eggs to Emanuel Snowman of London antique dealer Wartski. Two years later it was sold to Queen Mary of Teck and inherited by Queen Elizabeth II in 1953. It remains in the Royal Collection.

From July to October 2011, the Colonnade Egg was featured in the Royal Fabergé exhibition during the summer opening of Buckingham Palace.

Other Fabergé eggs in the Royal Collection include:

- Twelve Panel, 1899, Alexander Kelch to his wife Barbara (Varvara) Kelch-Bazanova.
- Basket of Wild Flowers, 1901, Gift of Nicholas II to Empress Alexandra Feodorovna.
- Mosaic, 1914, gift of Nicholas II to Empress Alexandra Feodorovna.

== Alterations ==
The piece suffered several alterations from its original condition, easily recognizable thanks to historical photographs and descriptions. First, the cupid is now missing a silver-gilt staff or twig which was held in his right hand and pointed to the rotating dial ring below to indicate the hour. So a fixed arrow mounted at the temple's top is used instead for this purpose. Lastly, the protruding finial at the egg's base is a later addition too.

== See also ==
- Egg decorating
- Tsarevich (Fabergé egg)

== Sources ==
- Faber, Toby (2008). Faberge's Eggs: The Extraordinary Story of the Masterpieces That Outlived an Empire. Random House. ISBN 978-1-4000-6550-9.
- Forbes, Christopher; Prinz von Hohenzollern, Johann Georg (1990). FABERGE; The Imperial Eggs. Prestel. ASIN B000YA9GOM.
- Lowes, Will (2001). Fabergé Eggs: A Retrospective Encyclopedia. Scarecrow Press. ISBN 0-8108-3946-6.
- Snowman, A Kenneth (1988). Carl Faberge: Goldsmith to the Imperial Court of Russia. Gramercy. ISBN 0-517-40502-4.
- The 1910 Colonnade Egg:A Possible Source Is Proposed
