= Rosebud (Fabergé egg) =

1895 Imperial Fabergé Egg

Rosebud Fabergé egg
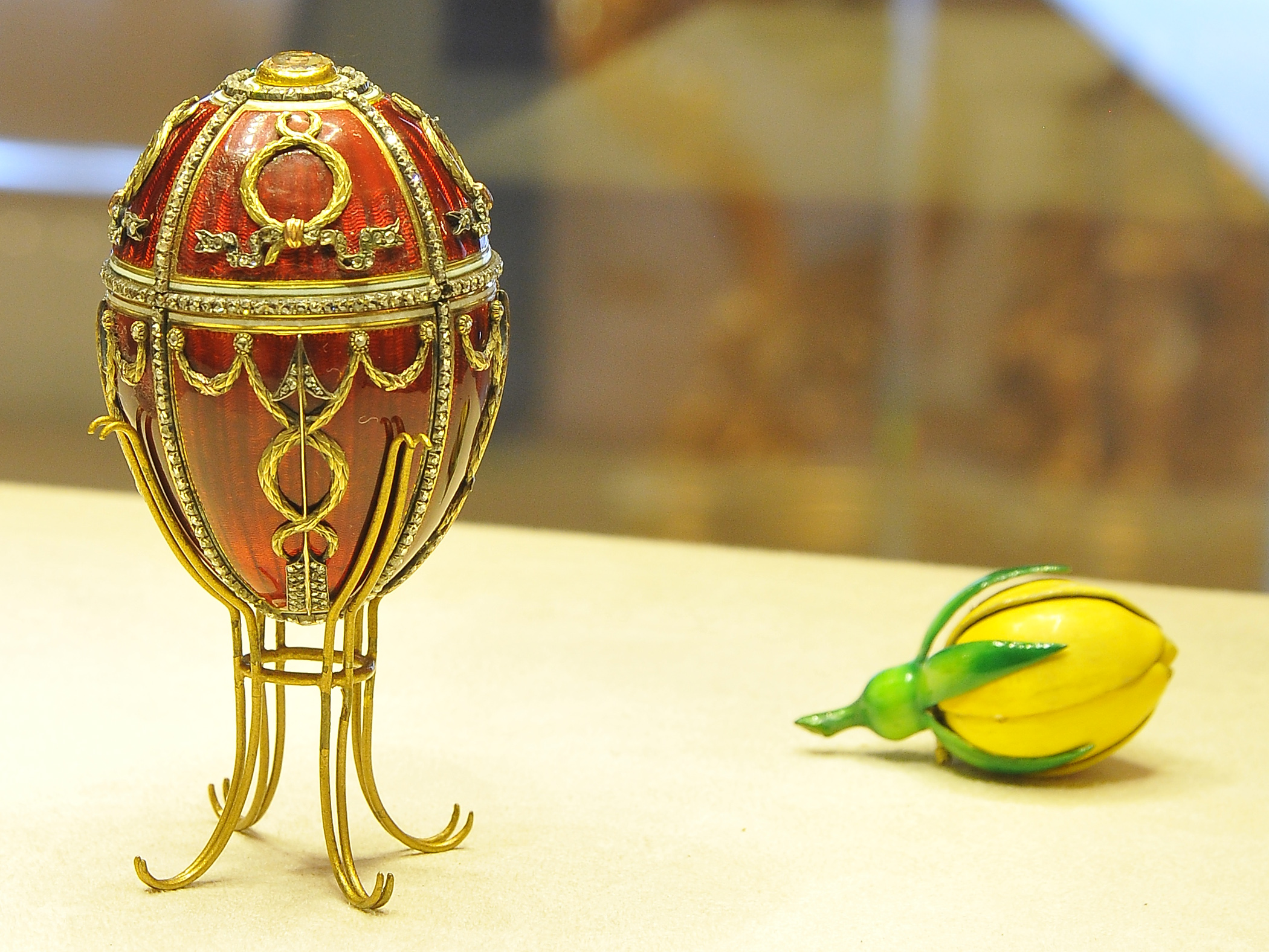
- Year delivered: 1895
- Customer: Nicholas II
- Recipient: Alexandra Feodorovna

Current owner
- Individual or institution: Viktor Vekselberg; Fabergé Museum in Saint Petersburg, Russia
- Year of acquisition: 2004

Design and materials
- Workmaster: Michael Perchin
- Surprise: A golden crown, with diamonds and rubies, and cabochon ruby pendant

The Rosebud egg is a jewelled enameled Easter egg made by Michael Perchin under the supervision of the Russian jeweller Peter Carl Fabergé in 1895, for Nicholas II of Russia, who presented the egg to his wife, Empress Alexandra Feodorovna. It was the first Fabergé egg that Nicholas presented to Alexandra.

== History ==
After the death of Alexander III of Russia, his son, Nicholas married Princess Alix of Hesse and by Rhine, who subsequently became Empress Alexandra of Russia, following the accession to the throne of her husband, Nicholas II of Russia. Princess Alix missed the rose garden of Rosenhöhe, Darmstadt, and so this egg reminded her of them during her first Easter with her new husband. The familiar yellow rose in 1895 was the yellow China tea rose that had been introduced by Parkes from China in 1824, re-bloomed in fall and was a staple of milder gardens than Saint Petersburg, where it was not hardy. Yellow roses were the most valued ones in the Empress' native Germany.

The egg embodied Fabergé's embrace of Neo-Classicism, in opposition to the dominance of Art Nouveau in late 19th century contemporary design. Fabergé charged 3,250 rubles for the egg.

In 1917 the egg was confiscated by the Russian Provisional Government and later sold to Emanuel Snowman of the jewellers Wartski around 1927. It was owned by a certain Charles Parsons in the 1930s, and was lost for decades, amid rumours that it had been damaged in a marital dispute. It was this damage that helped Malcolm Forbes identify the egg when he purchased it in 1985 from the Fine Art Society in London. In 2004 it was sold as part of the Forbes Collection to Viktor Vekselberg. Vekselberg purchased some nine Imperial eggs from the collection, for almost $100 million.

The egg is now part of the Victor Vekselberg Collection, owned by The Link of Times Foundation, and housed in the Fabergé Museum in Saint Petersburg, Russia.

== Surprise ==
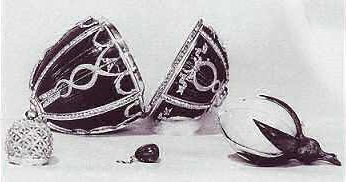
A 1920s photo showing the egg with its three original surprises; a yellow rosebud, a miniature version of the Russian Imperial crown and a ruby pendant. The side of the crown is shown instead of the front.

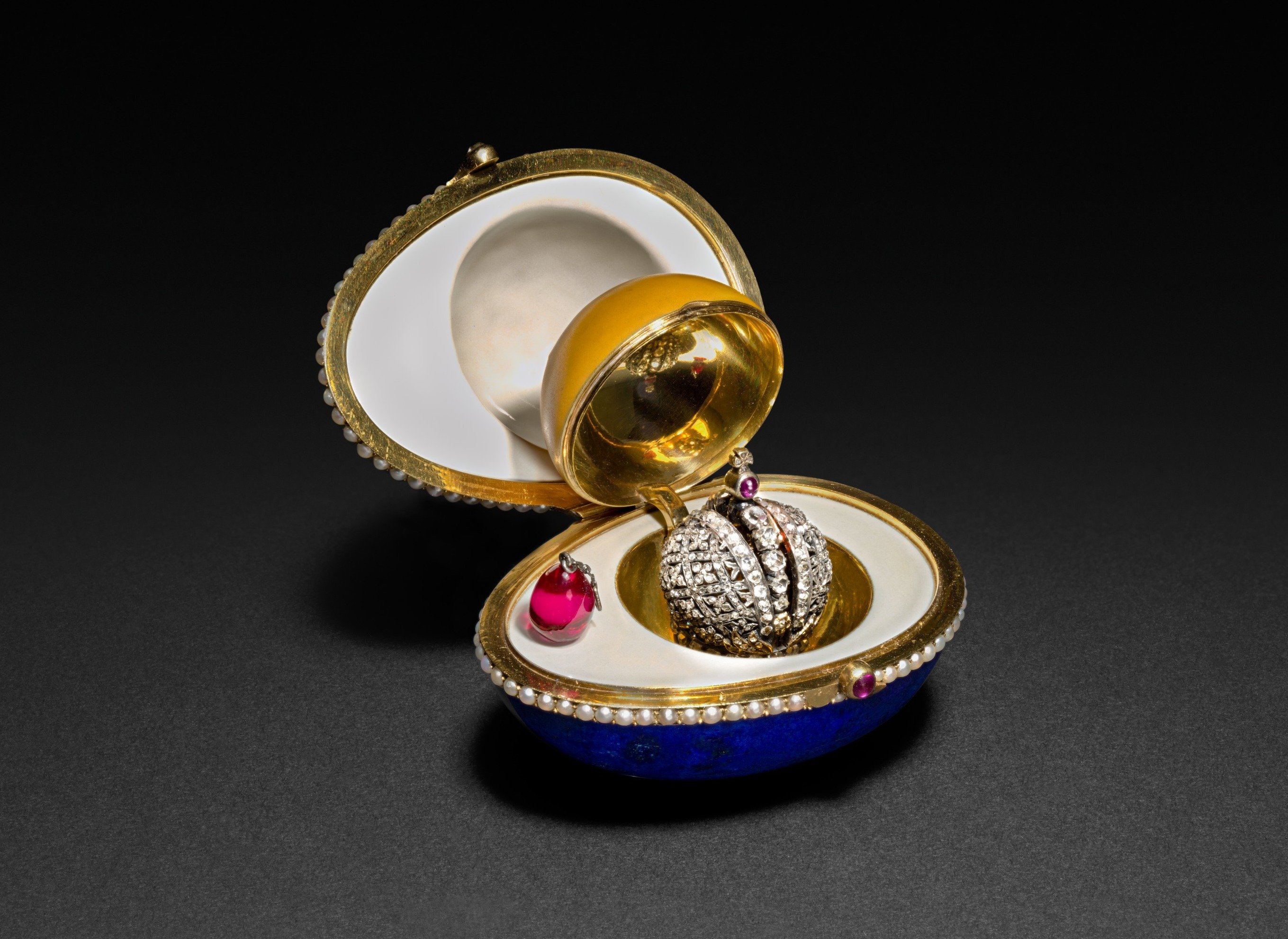
It has been suggested that the Lapis Lazuli egg might be a Fauxbergé made to contain the original surprises of the Rosebud egg. The photo shows the front of the tiny crown, next to an egg-shaped ruby pendant.

The egg opens like a bonbonnière to reveal a yellow-enamelled rosebud, in which two surprises were originally contained; a miniature version of the Imperial Crown of Russia with diamonds and two cabochon rubies and an egg-shaped ruby pendant suspended from it. The crown was a reference to Alexandra Feodorovna's new role as Empress of Russia, following the accession to the throne of her husband, Nicholas II of Russia.

For decades, the surprises were considered to be lost, but they have been identified according to an article published in September 2021 in The Burlington Magazine and another one in the Fabergé Research Newsletter Winter 2021. In the latter, two independent Fabergé researchers came separately to the same conclusion; they are the surprises contained in the so-called Lapis Lazuli egg owned by the Cleveland Museum of Art.

== See also ==
- Egg decorating

== Sources ==
- Faber, Toby (2008). Faberge's Eggs: The Extraordinary Story of the Masterpieces That Outlived an Empire. Random House. ISBN 978-1-4000-6550-9.
- Forbes, Christopher; Prinz von Hohenzollern, Johann Georg (1990). FABERGE; The Imperial Eggs. Prestel. ASIN B000YA9GOM.
- Lowes, Will (2001). Fabergé Eggs: A Retrospective Encyclopedia. Scarecrow Press. ISBN 0-8108-3946-6.
- Snowman, A Kenneth (1988). Carl Faberge: Goldsmith to the Imperial Court of Russia. Gramercy. ISBN 0-517-40502-4.
