= Pihl =

Family name

Pihl is a surname. Notable people with the surname include:

- Abraham Pihl (1756–1821), Norwegian clergyman, astronomer and architect
- Alexander Pihl (1920–2009), Norwegian physician
- Alma Pihl (1888–1976), Fabergé workmaster
- Andreas Pihl (born 1973), Swedish ice hockey player
- Carl Abraham Pihl (1825–1897), Norwegian civil engineer
- Einar Pihl (1926/1927–2009), Swedish sprint canoeist
- Gary Pihl (born 1950), American musician
- Gösta Pihl (1907–1992), Swedish sport shooter
- Helena Pihl (born 1955), Swedish sprinter
- Hollie Pihl (1928–2018), American judge
- Jüri Pihl (1954–2019), Estonian politician
- Oskar Pihl (1890–1959), Finnish silversmith and Fabergé workmaster
- Ove Pihl (1938–2026), Swedish art director, book publisher, and graphic designer
- Raimo Pihl (born 1949), Swedish decathlete
- Robert O. Pihl (born 1939), American psychologist
- Tove Pihl (1924–1987), Norwegian educator and politician

== See also ==
- Anna Pihl, a Danish television series
