= Imperial Coronation (Fabergé egg) =

1897 Imperial Fabergé egg

Imperial Coronation Fabergé egg
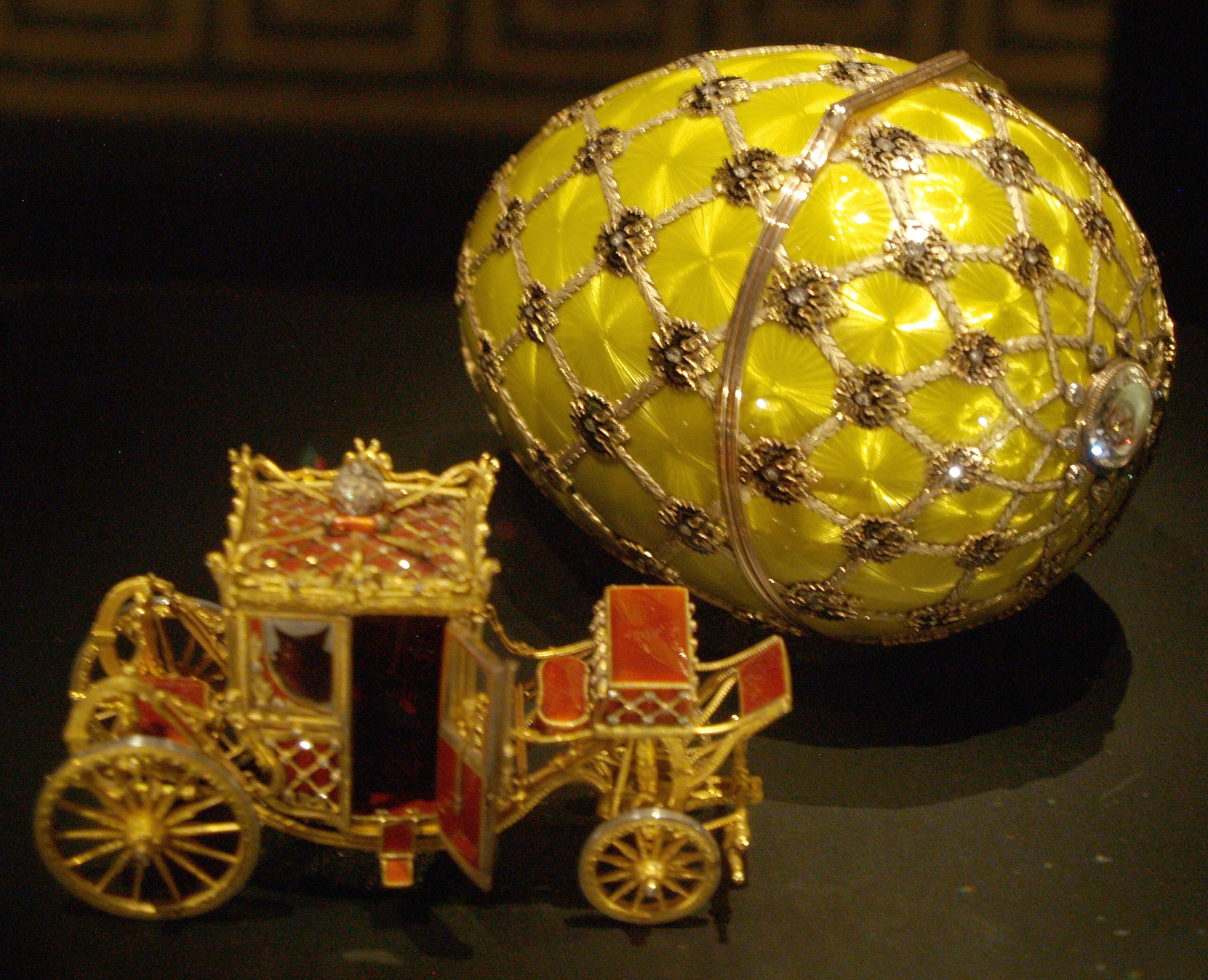
- Year delivered: 1897
- Customer: Nicholas II
- Recipient: Alexandra Fyodorovna

Current owner
- Individual or institution: Viktor Vekselberg; Fabergé Museum in Saint Petersburg, Russia
- Year of acquisition: 2004

Design and materials
- Workmaster: Michael Perkhin, Henrik Wigström
- Materials used: Gold, diamond, enamel
- Surprise: Gold coach

The Imperial Coronation egg is a jewelled Fabergé egg made under the supervision of the Russian jeweller, Peter Carl Fabergé, in 1897 by Fabergé ateliers, Mikhail Perkhin and Henrik Wigstrom. The egg was made to commemorate Tsarina, Empress Alexandra Fyodorovna.

It was frequently on exhibition at The Hermitage Museum (specifically the Winter Palace) in St. Petersburg, Russia, and also materialised in various museums worldwide, placed in temporary exhibits there. It is currently owned by Viktor Vekselberg, a Russian oligarch.

== Design ==
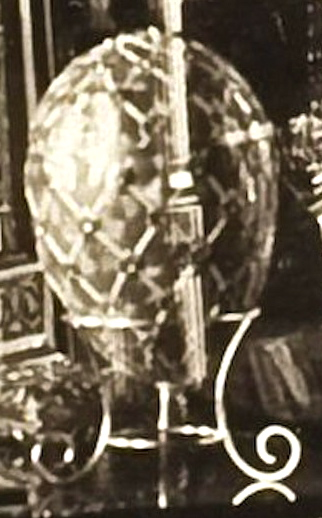
The piece with its original stand in 1902, now lost

The egg is made from gold with translucent lime yellow enamel on a guilloché field of starbursts and is in reference to the cloth-of-gold robe worn by the Tsarina at her Coronation.

It is trellised with bands of greenish gold laurel leaves mounted at each intersection by a gold Imperial double-headed eagle enamelled opaque black, and set with a rose diamond on its chest. This pattern was also drawn from the Coronation robe worn by the Empress.

Imperial Monogram of Empress Alexandra Feodorovna

A large portrait diamond is set in the top of the egg within a cluster of ten brilliant diamonds; through the table of this stone, the monogram of the Empress can be seen. At the other more narrow end, a smaller portrait diamond is set within a cluster of rose diamonds surrounded by a flower motif made of 20 narrow gold petals. At this end of the egg, the portrait diamond covers the date 1897 inscribed on a plaque similar to that of the monogram. The egg was presented together with a glass-enclosed jadeite stand for the display of the carriage at a cost of 5650 rubles.

== Surprise ==
Fitted inside a velvet-lined compartment is a precise replica, less than 100 mm (4 inches) long, of the 18th-century Imperial coach that carried the Tsarina Alexandra to her coronation at Moscow's Dormition Cathedral.

The red colour of the original coach was recreated using strawberry coloured translucent enamel and the blue upholstery of the interior was also reproduced in enamels. The coach is surmounted by the Imperial Crown in rose diamonds and six double-headed eagles on the roof; it is fitted with engraved rock crystal windows and platinum tyres decorated with a diamond-set trellis in gold and an Imperial eagle in diamonds at either door. The miniature is complete with moving wheels, opening doors, actual C-spring shock absorbers and a tiny folding step-stair.

Missing surprises include an emerald or diamond pendant that hung inside the replica coach, a glass-enclosed jadeite stand for the display of the carriage as well as a stand made of silver-gilt wire.

The unique design of the carriage was made by the young master Georg Stein, who repeatedly visited the royal stables at St. Petersburg so that all parts of the model would accurately depict the carriage.

== History ==
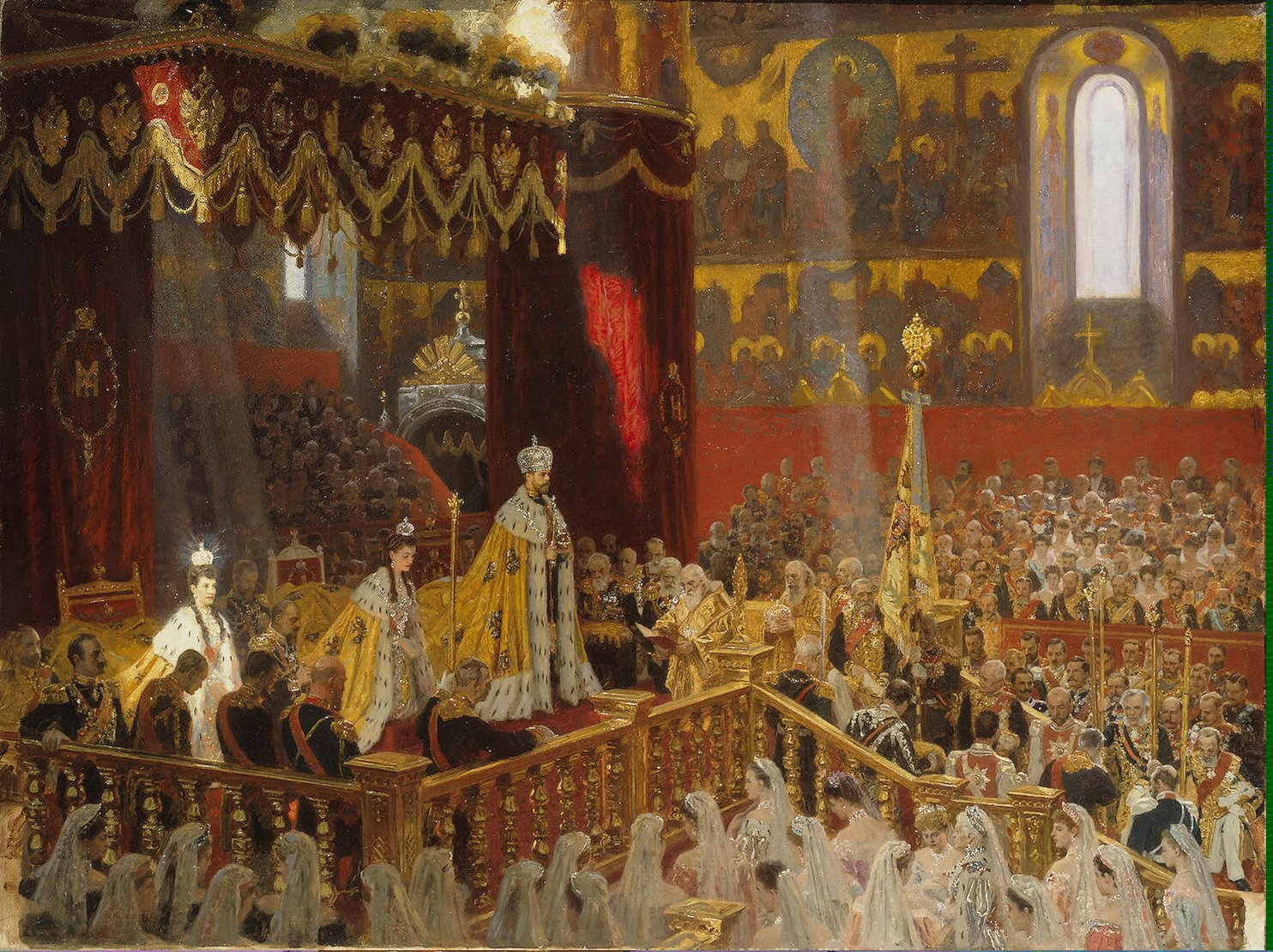
The last Romanov patriarchs at their Coronation Mass, painting by Laurits Regner Tuxen, 1898

The coronation of Tsar Nicholas II and his spouse, Empress Alexandra Fyodorovna was the catalyst for the Imperial Coronation Egg's creation, to celebrate the historical event. The coronation on May 14, 1896, was a day of jubilance and pride in the Romanovs, celebrated by throngs of spectators. The Russian nobility and guests gathered on the Eastern Orthodox day of Dormition, the feast of the death and bodily ascension to Heaven of the Virgin Mary, inside the Dormition Cathedral for the actual coronation. The throne of the Czar, the former throne of Michael I of Russia was inset with 870 diamonds, rubies, and pearls. The throne of the Tsarina, the famous ivory throne of Ivan the Great, also was inset with a vast collection of jewels and rare gemstones.

The gold miniature coach, which is removable from the interior of the Coronation Egg, is a replica of Catherine the Great's Gold Coach of 1793 used to transport the last Romanov rulers from ceremony to ceremony on the coronation week. Another artifact used in the coronation from the reign of Catherine was the Imperial Crown of Russia diamond crown made by Jérémie Pauzié in 1762.

The coronation in Moscow on May 26th 1896 was the most opulent celebration which I ever witnessed. It bordered close to the Oriental and lasted for 10 days. In Moscow the cathedral was filled with paintings on gold ground of saints and all priests were dressed in gold robes applied with embroidery and precious stones. A very deep feeling of mysticism was in all the ceremonies and you could feel the tradition of Byzance... And following the prayer for the Emperor he gets up and then is the only person standing at that moment in the whole Russian Empire... To look at all this must have been like a fantastic dream because the sun was shining on all.

— Ernest Louis, Grand Duke of Hesse, Brother of Empress Alexandra, Grandson of Queen Victoria

== Past and present ownerships ==
=== Royal origin ===
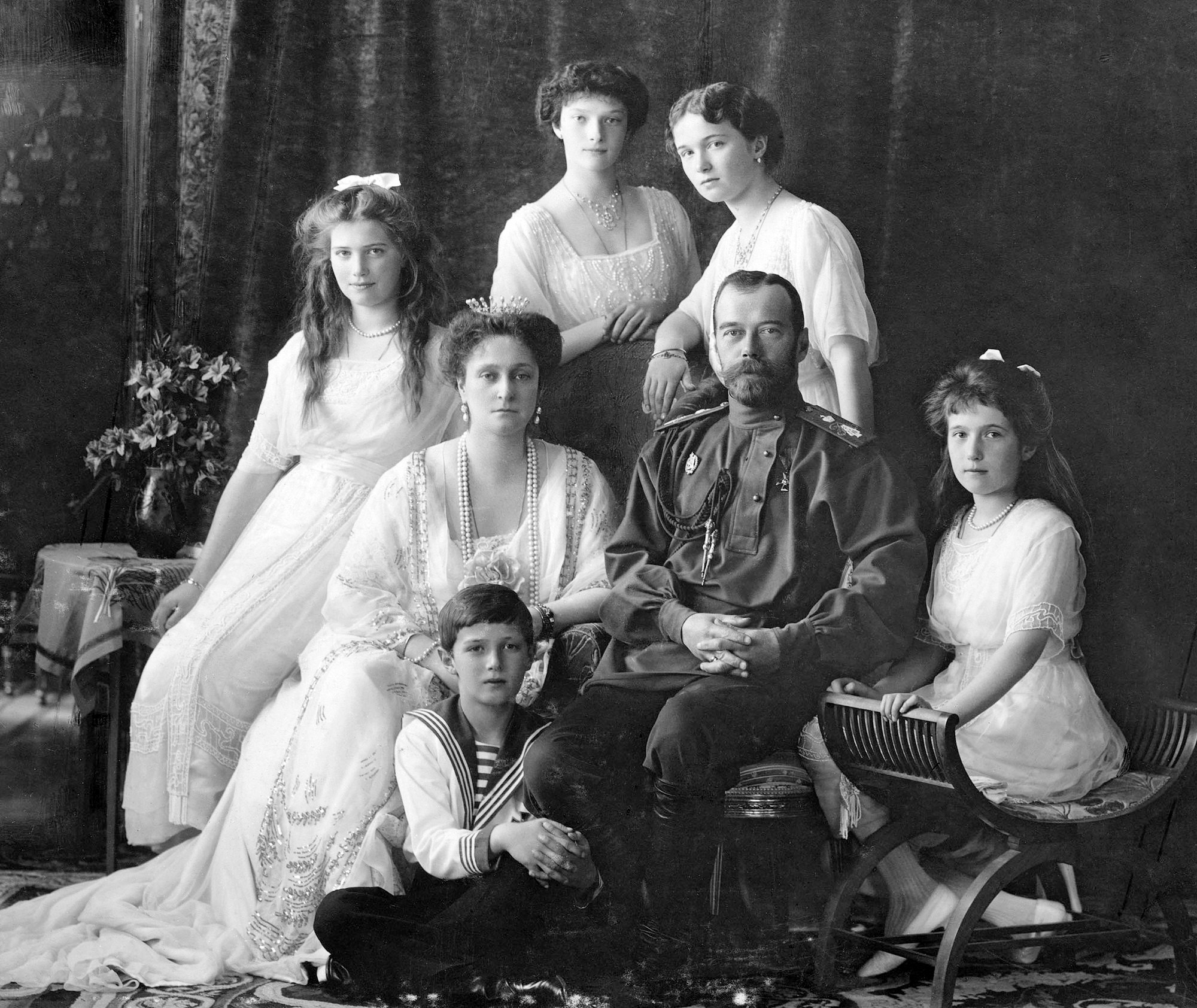
The Imperial Family, 1913; Left to right, seated: Grand Duchess Maria and Tsaritsa Alexandra; Tsarevitch Alexei; Tsar Nicholas II; Grand Duchess Anastasia; Standing: Grand Duchess Tatiana, Grand Duchess Olga

The Egg was first given to Tsarina Alexandra of Imperial Russia on Easter of 1897. The egg was displayed in the Empress' apartment at the Winter Palace in St. Petersburg, resting in a jewelled carriage. Upon the fall of the Romanov Dynasty, the egg was confiscated by the Provisional Government in 1917 and was listed among the treasures removed from the Anichkov Palace. It was then dispatched to the Kremlin and finally transferred to the Sovnarkom in 1922 for sale.

=== Further transactions ===
The egg was purchased in 1927 by Emanuel Snowman for Wartski, a family-owned firm of art and antique dealers in London. The egg was then sold to collector Charles Parsons in 1934, was reacquired by Wartski in 1945, and remained with the company until early 1979.

=== Late twentieth century ===
In March 1979, the egg was sold to Malcolm Forbes for US$2.16 million along with the Lilies of the Valley Fabergé Egg.

In 2004, nine Fabergé eggs, including the Imperial Coronation Egg, were to be sold by Sotheby's Auction House, however on February 4, 2004, Sotheby's announced that more than 180 Fabergé art pieces, including the 9 rare Fabergé eggs, had been withdrawn from auction and privately sold to Viktor Vekselberg. The official selling price of the Coronation Egg to Vekselberg was never publicly disclosed by Sotheby's, fueling much speculation. In a 2013 BBC Four documentary, Vekselberg revealed he had spent just over $100 million purchasing the 9 Fabergé eggs.

The Fabergé Collection represents perhaps the most significant example of our cultural heritage outside Russia. The religious, spiritual, and emotional content captured by these Faberge eggs touches upon the soul of the Russian people.

— Victor Vekselberg, Chairman of Renova Group

== Representation in film ==
The James Bond film, Octopussy (1983), encompasses the mysterious appearance of a counterfeit Coronation Egg at a party in the British ambassador's residence in East Berlin. The plot for the film is adapted from Ian Fleming's 1963 short story "The Property of a Lady".

An accurate model of the Imperial Coronation Egg was depicted in the 2004 crime film Ocean's Twelve. The replica was produced by design studio Vivian Alexander, popular for recreating famous items of jewelry for public and private purposes. In the film, the egg was stolen in a grand heist while being transferred to a museum in Rome.

A replica of the Imperial Coronation Egg, along with the surprise coach, appear in the first episode of the Amazon.com series The Romanoffs (2018).

== See also ==
- Objet d'art
- Alexander III of Russia
- Egg decorating
- Coronation of the Russian monarch

== Sources ==
- Faber, Toby (2008). Faberge's Eggs: The Extraordinary Story of the Masterpieces That Outlived an Empire. Random House. ISBN 978-1-4000-6550-9.
- Forbes, Christopher; Prinz von Hohenzollern, Johann Georg (1990). FABERGE; The Imperial Eggs. Prestel. ASIN B000YA9GOM.
- Lowes, Will (2001). Fabergé Eggs: A Retrospective Encyclopedia. Scarecrow Press. ISBN 0-8108-3946-6.
- Snowman, A Kenneth (1988). Carl Faberge: Goldsmith to the Imperial Court of Russia. Gramercy. ISBN 0-517-40502-4.
