= Mosaic (Fabergé egg) =

1914 Imperial Fabergé egg

Mosaic Fabergé egg
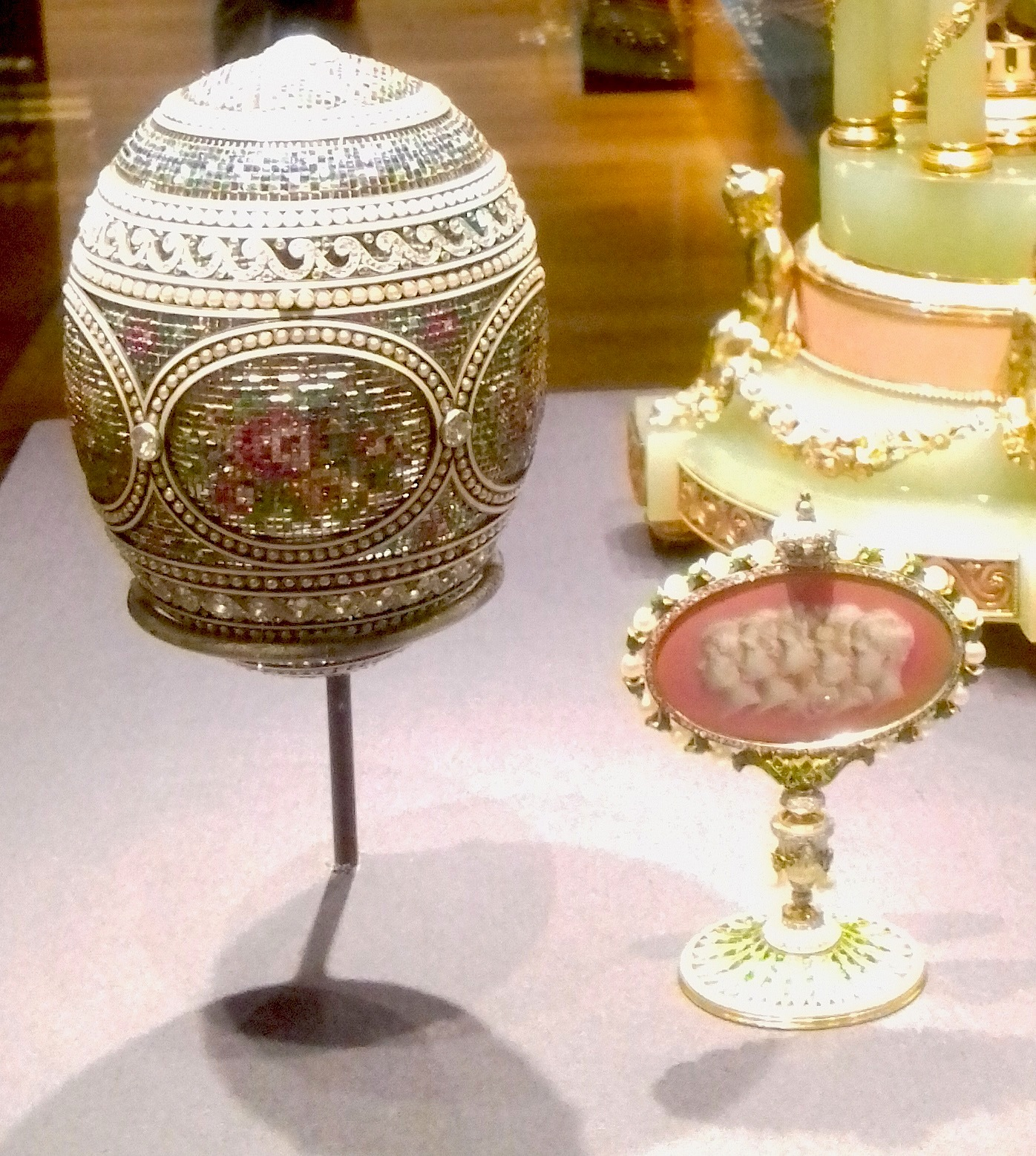
- Year delivered: 1914
- Customer: Nicholas II
- Recipient: Alexandra Feodorovna

Current owner
- Individual or institution: Charles III
- Year of acquisition: 2022, inherited from Elizabeth II

Design and materials
- Workmaster: Albert Holmström
- Materials used: Gold, platinum, enamel, diamond, various gems
- Height: 95 millimetres (3.7 in)
- Width: 70 millimetres (2.8 in) diameter
- Surprise: Group portrait of the imperial children on a pedestal stand 79 by 55 by 29 millimetres (3.1 in × 2.2 in × 1.1 in)

The Mosaic egg is a jewelled enameled Easter egg made under the supervision of the Russian jeweller Peter Carl Fabergé in 1914. The Fabergé egg was made for Nicholas II of Russia, who presented it to his wife, the Empress Alexandra Feodorovna on Easter 1914. Its Easter 1914 counterpart (presented to the Dowager Empress) is the Catherine the Great egg.

== Design ==
The Egg was crafted by Albert Holmström (1876–1925) under the supervision of Peter Carl Fabergé and is made of yellow gold, platinum, brilliant diamonds, rose-cut diamonds, ruby, emerald, topaz, sapphire, garnet, half-pearls, moonstone, white enamel and opaque pink enamel. It consists of a series of yellow gold belts which are pavé-set with diamonds and a variety of gems in a floral pattern, providing a look of petit point tapestry work.

The pattern of the egg contains five oval panels bordered by half-pearls set in enamel, with brilliant diamonds placed at each intersection. The technical precision of the design was complemented by platinum that was cut, rather than welded. At the apex of the egg is a moonstone through which can be seen the year 1914 and Empress Alexandra's initials in Russian characters.

=== Inspiration ===
The floral tapestry pattern was designed by Alma Theresia Pihl, who was inspired by needlework fire screens found in aristocratic sitting rooms of the time. Pihl was the niece of the egg's workmaster Albert Holmström, who came from a family of Finnish jewelers employed by Fabergé.

== Surprise ==
The pedestal surprise is made of gold, pearls, rose-cut diamonds, green garnets, translucent green, opaque white, opalescent pale pink, pale green and pale sepia grisaille enamel. The surprise is a removable miniature frame with relief profiles of Nicholas and Alexandra's five children in a cameo brooch style. The back of the frame is enameled with a sepia basket of flowers. The basket is bordered with the year 1914 and the names of each of the Romanov children (Anastasia Nikolaevna, Alexis Romanov, Olga Nikolaevna, Maria Nikolaevna, Tatiana Nikolaevna). The frame rests on a gold stand in the shape of the royal crown and is held in place within the egg by gold clips.

== History ==
The Mosaic Egg was commissioned by Tsar Nicholas II and presented to his wife, Empress Alexandra Fedorovna for Easter 1914. It was later confiscated, along with much of the family's belongings, by the provisional government in 1917 during the Russian Revolution. In 1933 the egg was sold by the Antikvariat to an unknown buyer for 5,000 roubles, though the Royal Collection online object description suggests that it was likely purchased by Armand Hammer. On 22 May 1933 it was purchased from Cameo Corner, London, by King George V for 250 pounds "half cost", likely as a gift for Queen Mary's birthday.

The Mosaic Egg remains a part of the Royal Collection and was included in a public display from July to October 2011 in the exhibit Royal Fabergé during the summer opening of Buckingham Palace.

Other Fabergé eggs in the Royal Collection include:

- Twelve Panel, 1899, Gift of Alexander Kelch to his wife Barbara (Varvara) Kelch-Bazanova.
- Basket of Wild Flowers, 1901, Gift of Nicholas II to Empress Alexandra Feodorovna.
- Colonnade, 1910, Gift of Nicholas II to Empress Alexandra Feodorovna.

== See also ==
- Winter (Fabergé egg)

== Sources ==
- Faber, Toby (2008). Faberge's Eggs: The Extraordinary Story of the Masterpieces That Outlived an Empire. Random House. ISBN 978-1-4000-6550-9.
- Forbes, Christopher; Prinz von Hohenzollern, Johann Georg (1990). FABERGE; The Imperial Eggs. Prestel. ASIN B000YA9GOM.
- Lowes, Will (2001). Fabergé Eggs: A Retrospective Encyclopedia. Scarecrow Press. ISBN 0-8108-3946-6.
- Snowman, A Kenneth (1988). Carl Faberge: Goldsmith to the Imperial Court of Russia. Gramercy. ISBN 0-517-40502-4.
