= August Wilhelm Holmström =

Finnish jeweller (1829–1903)

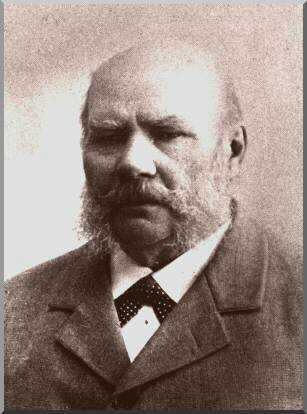
- Born: October 2, 1829; Helsinki, Grand Duchy of Finland, Russian Empire
- Died: 1903 (aged 73–74)

August Wilhelm Holmström (2 October 1829 – 1903) was a Finnish jeweller. He was a senior member of Fabergé's workshop.

== Life ==
Born in Helsinki, Finland, he became an apprentice at the workshop of jeweller Karl Herold in St. Petersburg (1845–1850), then master in 1857 with his own workshop.

He was senior member of Fabergé's workshop, he was head jeweller and also produced parts for composite articles. He died in St. Petersburg. His son Albert Holmström (1876–1925) continued in his father's footsteps after his death and used the same mark, AH.

His daughter, Hilma Alina Holmström (1875–1936), and granddaughter, Alma Pihl (1888–1976), were both jewellery designers and workmasters at Fabergé. Alma designed the Winter Easter Egg and the Mosaic Easter Egg. His grandson, Oskar Woldemar Pihl (1890–1959), was also a jeweller and goldsmith.

== Sources ==
- G.von Habsburg-Lothringen & A.von Solodkoff, Fabergé - Court Jeweler to the Tsars (1979)
- Geoffrey Watts, Russian Silversmiths' Hallmarks (1700 to 1917) (2006)
- Ulla Tillander-Godenhielm, Fabergén suomalaiset mestarit (Fabergé's Finnish masters) (2011)
