= Swan (Fabergé egg) =

1906 Imperial Fabergé egg

Swan Fabergé egg
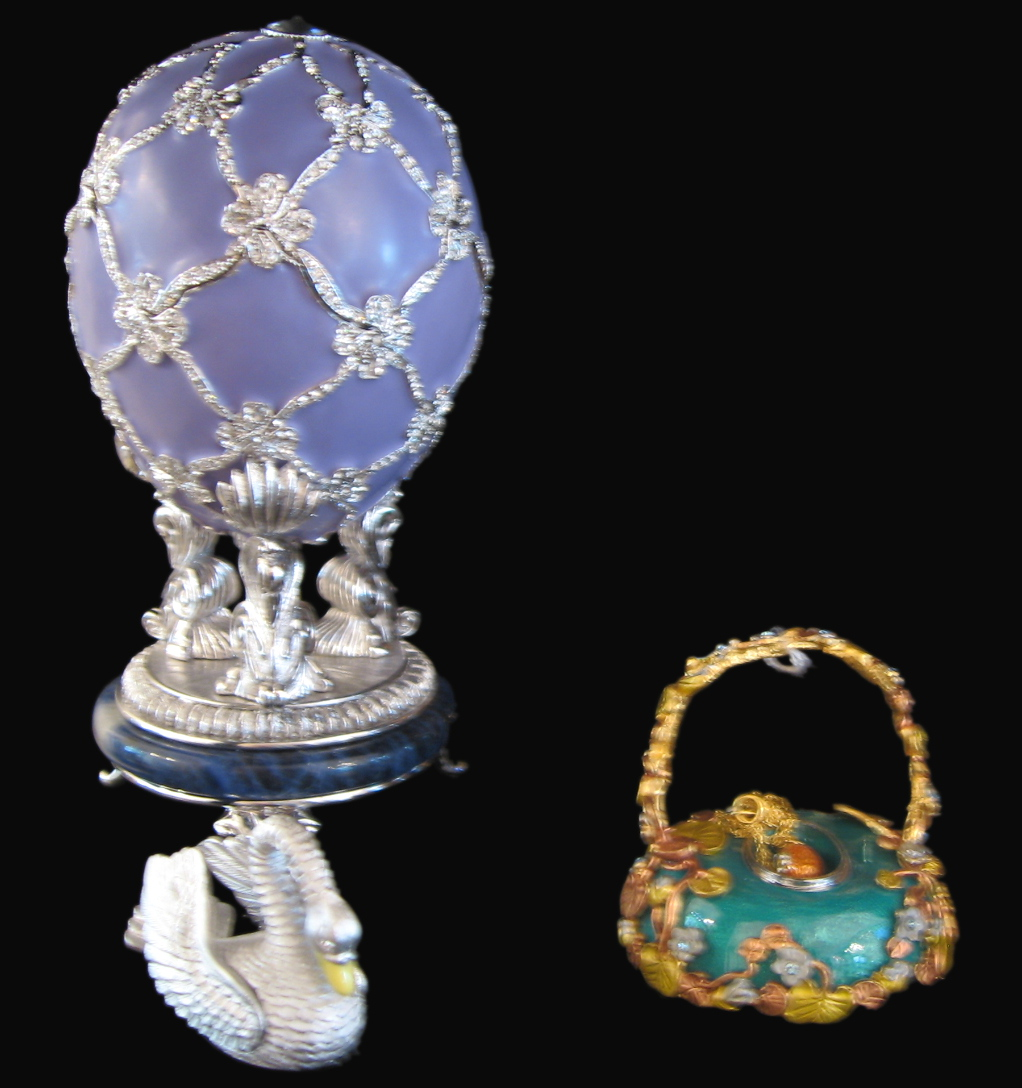
- Modern replica of the Swan Egg
- Year delivered: 1906
- Customer: Nicholas II
- Recipient: Maria Feodorovna

Current owner
- Individual or institution: Fondation Edouard et Maurice Sandoz, Switzerland
- Year of acquisition: 1954

Design and materials
- Materials used: Gold, matt opaque mauve enamel, rose-cut diamonds, portrait diamond
- Height: 100 millimetres (3.9 in)
- Surprise: Miniature swan on a "lake" of aquamarine

The Swan egg is a Fabergé egg, one in a series of fifty-two jewelled eggs made under the supervision of Peter Carl Fabergé. Commissioned in 1906 by Tsar Nicholas II, the egg was presented to the Dowager Empress Maria Feodorovna on Easter that year for her 40th wedding anniversary.

== Design ==
The egg is made of mauve enamel, with gold trim. On the exterior is a twisted ribbon trellis design of rose-cut diamonds, as well as a portrait diamond on the top inscribed "1906". Another portrait diamond on the other end once held the Imperial monograph. The "surprise" that came inside the egg is a miniature gold and silver swan on a "lake" of aquamarine. By winding a gear beneath one of the wings, the swan's mechanical neck and wings move. In Russia, the swan is considered a symbol of family life and the permanence of the bond of marriage.

The miniature swan is modelled after James Cox’s Silver Swan, an automaton dating from the 18th Century, now housed in the Bowes Museum, Barnard Castle, County Durham, England. Fabergé probably saw the automaton when it was in display in Paris at the International Exposition of 1867 (World's fair).

== Ownership ==
Purchased by King Farouk of Egypt in 1949, the egg was later sold off by the Egyptian Revolutionary Command Council in 1954 at the Palace Collections Sale. This sale saw the dispersion of hundreds of Fabergé objects collected by the Egyptian Royal family. The egg was purchased by Wartski’s of London and later sold to the Fondation Edouard et Maurice Sandoz in Lausanne, Switzerland.

== Sources ==
- Faber, Toby (2008). Faberge's Eggs: The Extraordinary Story of the Masterpieces That Outlived an Empire. Random House. ISBN 978-1-4000-6550-9.
- Forbes, Christopher; Prinz von Hohenzollern, Johann Georg (1990). FABERGE; The Imperial Eggs. Prestel. ASIN B000YA9GOM.
- Lowes, Will (2001). Fabergé Eggs: A Retrospective Encyclopaedia. Scarecrow Press. ISBN 0-8108-3946-6.
- Snowman, A Kenneth (1988). Carl Faberge: Goldsmith to the Imperial Court of Russia. Gramercy. ISBN 0-517-40502-4.
