= Basket of Flowers (Fabergé egg) =

1901 Imperial Fabergé egg

Basket of Flowers Fabergé egg
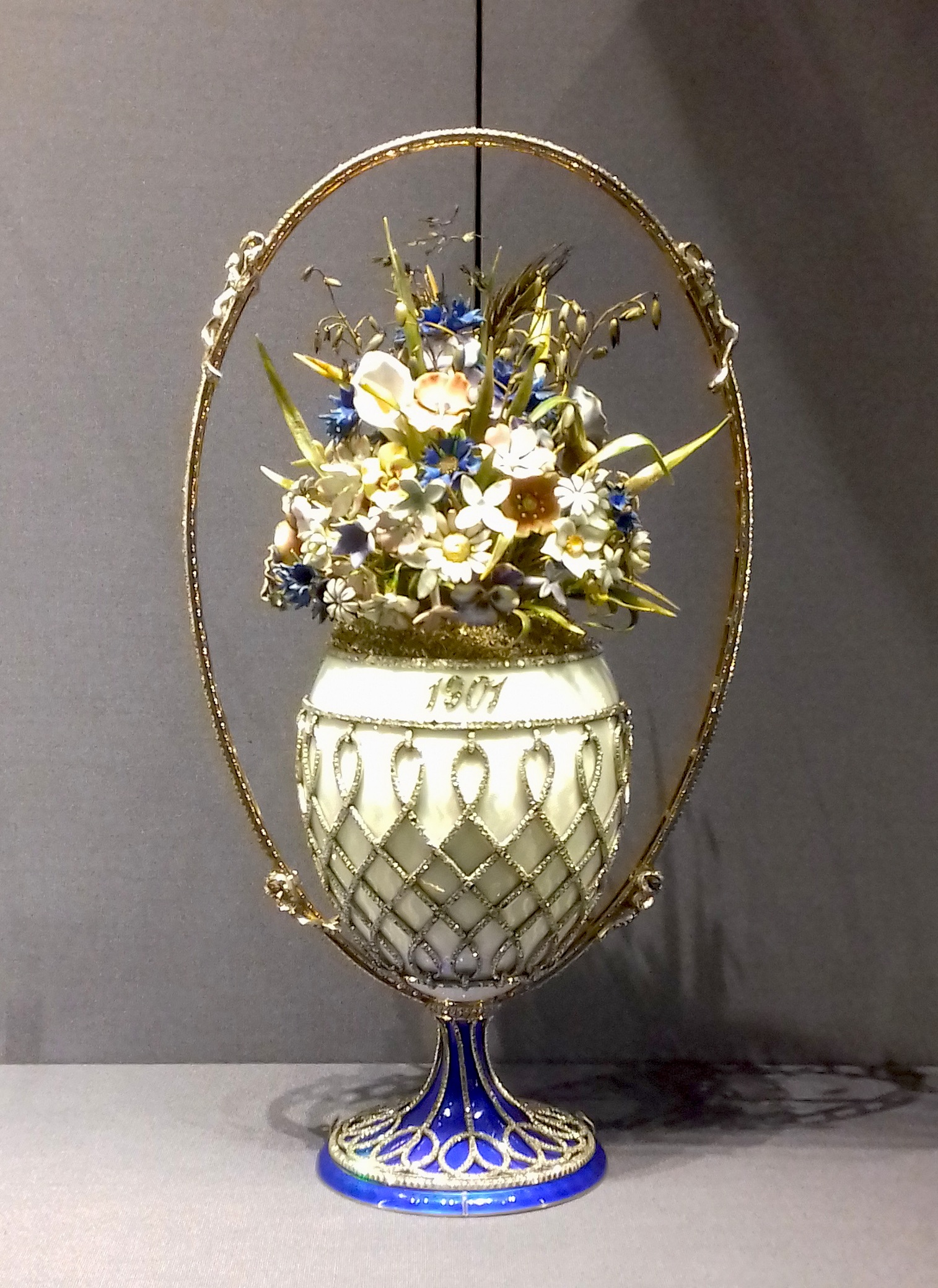
- Year delivered: 1901
- Customer: Nicholas II
- Recipient: Alexandra Feodorovna

Current owner
- Individual or institution: Charles III
- Year of acquisition: 2022, inherited from Elizabeth II

Design and materials
- Workmaster: Unknown
- Materials used: Silver, parcel gilt, pearls, oyster guilloché and blue enamel, gold, as well as hundreds of diamonds and opaque multi-colored emeralds
- Height: 230 millimetres (9.1 in)
- Width: 100 millimetres (3.9 in) diameter
- Surprise: Not known

The Basket of Flowers (Note: Fabergé himself referred to this egg as an "Easter egg, white enamel, with bouquet of wild flowers" (emphasis not in original— see Lowes and McCanless, 2001), suggesting that the egg should be titled, "Basket of Wildflowers egg", but this ignores the fact that several of the flowers depicted are not, in fact, "wild" flowers; modern reliable sources do not mention the "wild" characteristic of the egg in its name, which is most often given as "Basket of Flowers egg.") egg is a jewelled enameled Easter egg made under the supervision of Russian jeweller Peter Carl Fabergé in 1901. The Fabergé egg was made for Nicholas II of Russia, who presented it to his wife, Empress Alexandra Feodorovna.

It is unknown whether the egg originally came with a surprise (as most Imperial Easter eggs do). There is no evidence on the objet d'art that it ever had another piece attached or with it, and no document or photograph has been found proving the existence of an accompanying surprise. The egg was executed by one of Fabergé's workmasters, but the name of the workmaster was not recorded, and the egg bears no maker's marks or other hallmarks of its manufacture. At one point, these factors caused doubts about its authenticity. The egg is designed as a silver-gilt oyster guilloche basket containing a bouquet of blossoms of mock orange, daisies, pansies, calla lilies, cornflowers, morning glories, and oats. The date 1901 is displayed on the front in diamonds. The egg stands on a blue enameled pedestal (not its original—the original white enamel was likely damaged during the Russian Revolution and replaced/re-enameled with the blue seen today) and is surmounted by an arcing basket handle of gold and diamonds. The base and egg are also decorated in a trellis work of diamonds.

== History ==
Though the existence of the egg has been clear since its manufacture, its authenticity as an "imperial" egg (i.e., an egg made in Fabergé's workshop and intended as an Easter gift for either the Czar's wife or his mother) was in doubt for some time. Beginning in 1949, some authorities began to identify the egg as being a non-imperial Fabergé creation; then, in 1979, other authorities began to claim that it was the work of another jeweller altogether, a Boucheron of Paris who had imitated Fabergé. In 1991 experts finally agreed that this egg was indeed the 1901 Easter gift of Nicholas II of Russia to his wife, and was made by the House of Fabergé for this purpose, officially making it an imperial Fabergé egg.

In 1933, the egg was sold by the Antikvariat (a Soviet institution) probably to Emanuel Snowman of London antique dealers Wartski, and it was acquired by Mary of Teck, and inherited by Queen Elizabeth II in 1953. It remains in the Royal Collection.

The invoice issued by Fabergé in 1901 specifies: "Easter egg, white enamel. Basket with bouquet of wild flowers, with 4176 rose-cut diamonds and 10 pearls" (English translation). For years it was believed that the piece had no pearls and that they might have been connected with a possible surprise. However, in 2019, at the request of a Fabergé enthusiast, an examination of the object by the Royal Collection Trust staff proved that the egg originally had the ten pearls (in the centre of some flowers) mentioned in the invoice. There are now four pearls and six prongs (where there used to be pearls) surviving.

== See also ==
- Egg decorating

== Sources ==
- Faber, Toby (2008). Faberge's Eggs: The Extraordinary Story of the Masterpieces That Outlived an Empire. Random House. ISBN 978-1-4000-6550-9.
- Forbes, Christopher; Prinz von Hohenzollern, Johann Georg (1990). FABERGE; The Imperial Eggs. Prestel. ASIN B000YA9GOM.
- Lowes, Will (2001). Fabergé Eggs: A Retrospective Encyclopedia. Scarecrow Press. ISBN 0-8108-3946-6.
- Snowman, A Kenneth (1988). Carl Faberge: Goldsmith to the Imperial Court of Russia. Gramercy. ISBN 0-517-40502-4.
