= Nicholas Snowman =

British arts administrator and chairman of the jewellers Wartski (1944–2023)

Nicholas Snowman OBE
- Born: Michael Nicholas Snowman; 18 March 1944
- Died: 2 March 2023 (aged 78)
- Occupations: Jeweler and arts administrator
- Known for: Chairman of the jewellers Wartski
- Spouse: Margo Michelle Rouard
- Children: 1 son
- Parents: Kenneth Snowman (father); Sallie Moghilevkine (mother)
- Relatives: Emanuel Snowman (grandfather)

Michael Nicholas Snowman OBE (18 March 1944 – 2 March 2023) was a British arts administrator and the chairman of the jewellers Wartski. In 2000, The Telegraph called him "one of the most influential figures in British classical music for the past 30 years".

== Early life ==
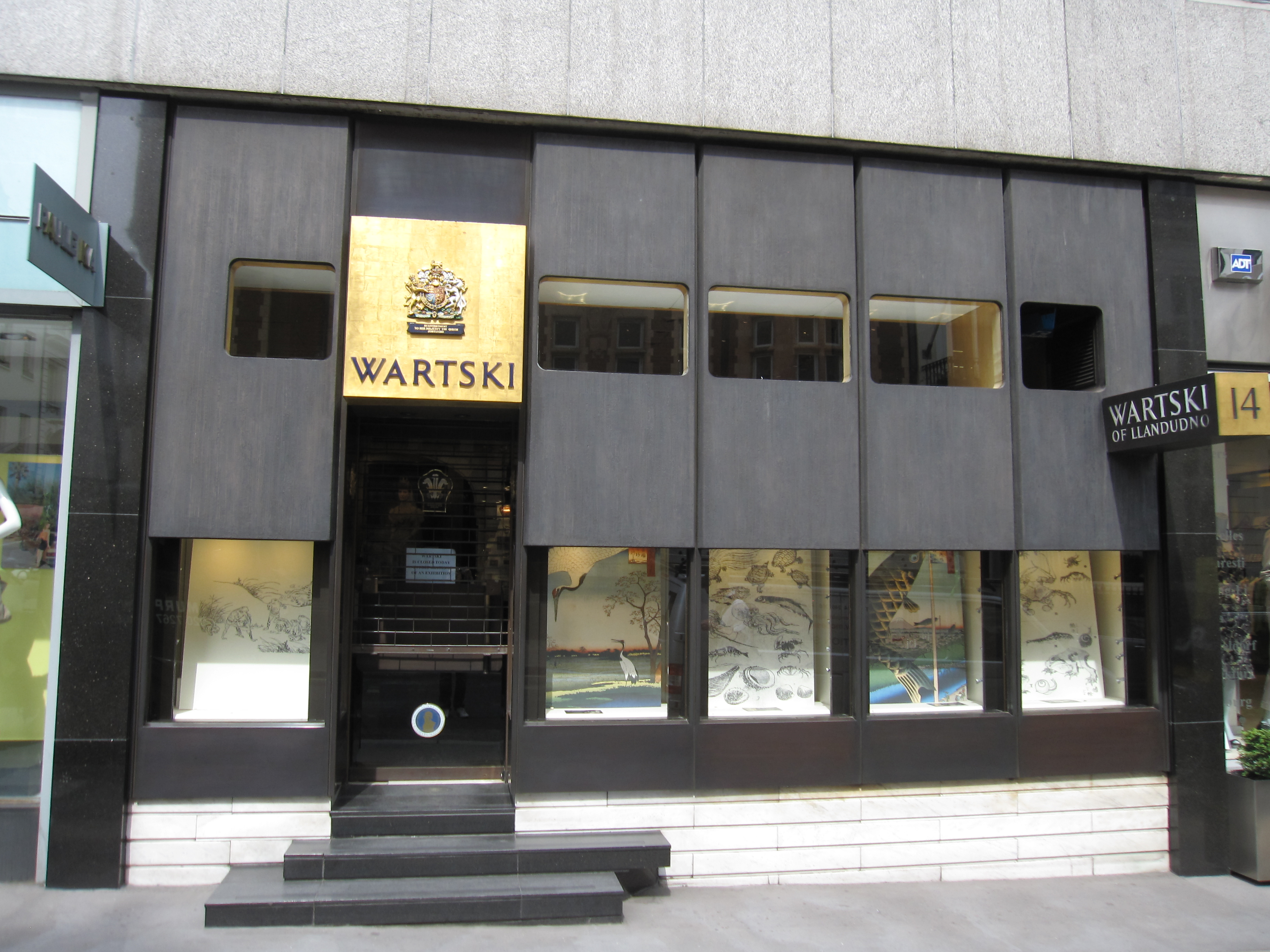
Wartski, Grafton Street, London

Nicholas Snowman was born on 18 March 1944, the son of Kenneth Snowman, and grandson of Emanuel Snowman, both jewellers and chairmen of Wartski. He was educated at Highgate School and Magdalene College, Cambridge, where he founded the Cambridge University Opera Society. He is a distant cousin of the actress Claire Bloom.

== Career ==
Snowman was the co-founder of London Sinfonietta and its general manager from 1968 to 1972. In 1976, Snowman, the composer and conductor Pierre Boulez and French culture minister Michel Guy co-founded the Ensemble InterContemporain in Paris.

Snowman was general director (Arts) at the Southbank Centre, London from 1986, becoming Chief Executive in 1992 until 1998.

On 28 October 1990, he appeared on Desert Island Discs, choosing Smiley's People by John le Carré as his favourite book and a coffee machine as his luxury item.

From 1998, he succeeded Anthony Whitworth-Jones as general manager of Glyndebourne Festival Opera. However, he left suddenly in 2000, because "he was resigning to spend more time with his family". A claim that he was sacked was denied by Snowman and by Gus Christie, executive chairman and son of Sir George Christie. From 2003 to 2009, he was director of Opéra national du Rhin in Strasbourg, France.

== Honours ==
Snowman was appointed a Chevalier of the Ordre des Arts et des Lettres, France in 1985, and raised to Officier in 1990, Order of Cultural Merit (Poland) 1990, Chevalier of the National Order of Merit (France) 1995. In 1999 he was awarded honorary membership of the Royal Academy of Music. He was appointed an Officer of the Order of the British Empire (OBE) in the 2014 Birthday Honours "For services to promoting British cultural interests in France".

== Personal life and death ==
Snowman married French-born Margo Michelle Rouard in 1983, and together they had one son, Hector Snowman. Sir Harrison Birtwistle composed Hector's Dawn on the occasion of his first birthday.

Snowman died after suffering a fall on 2 March 2023, at the age of 78.
