= Emanuel Snowman =

British jeweller (1886–1970)

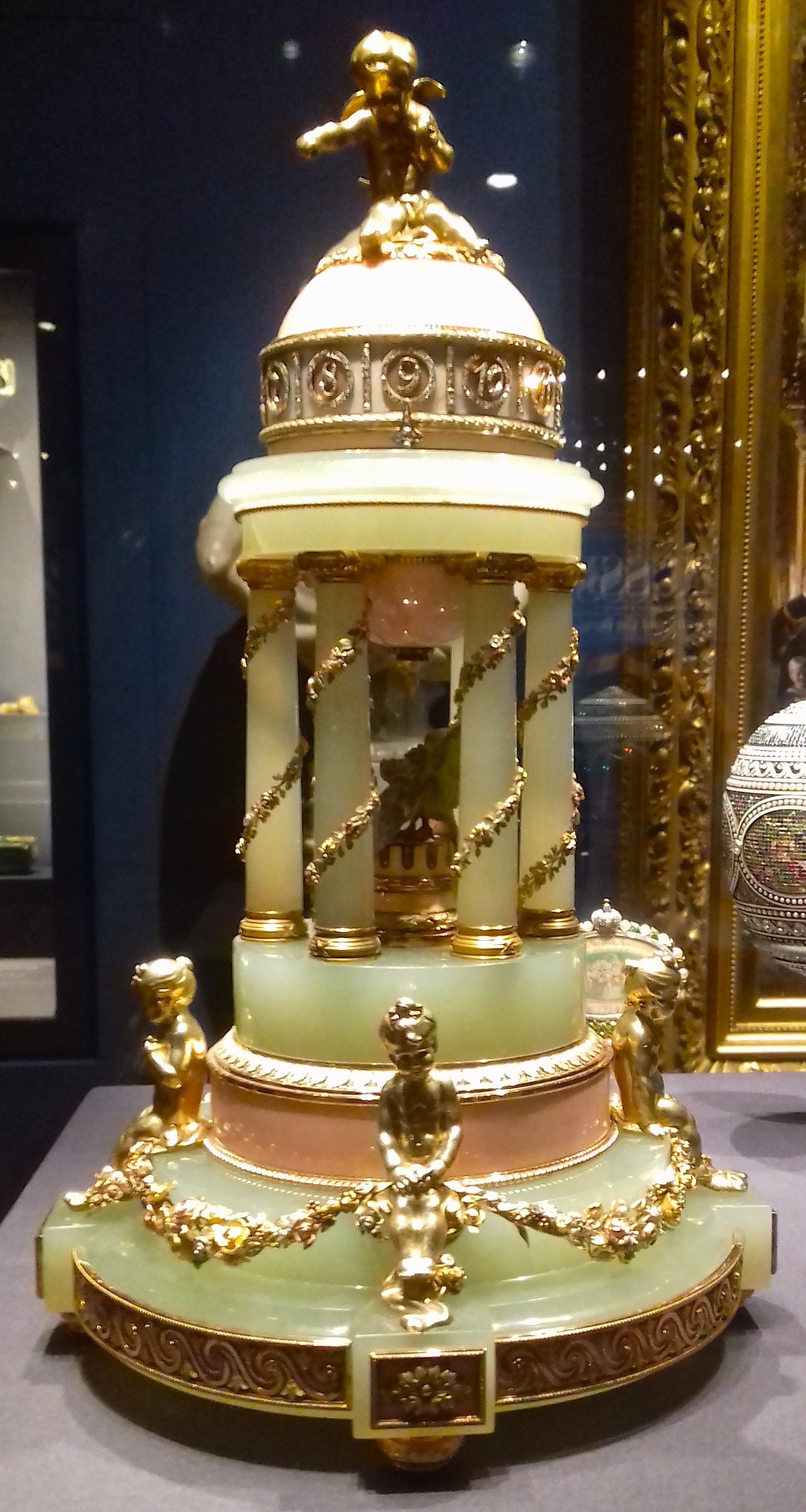
The Colonnade Fabergé Easter egg that Snowman purchased, one of nine that he was able to acquire

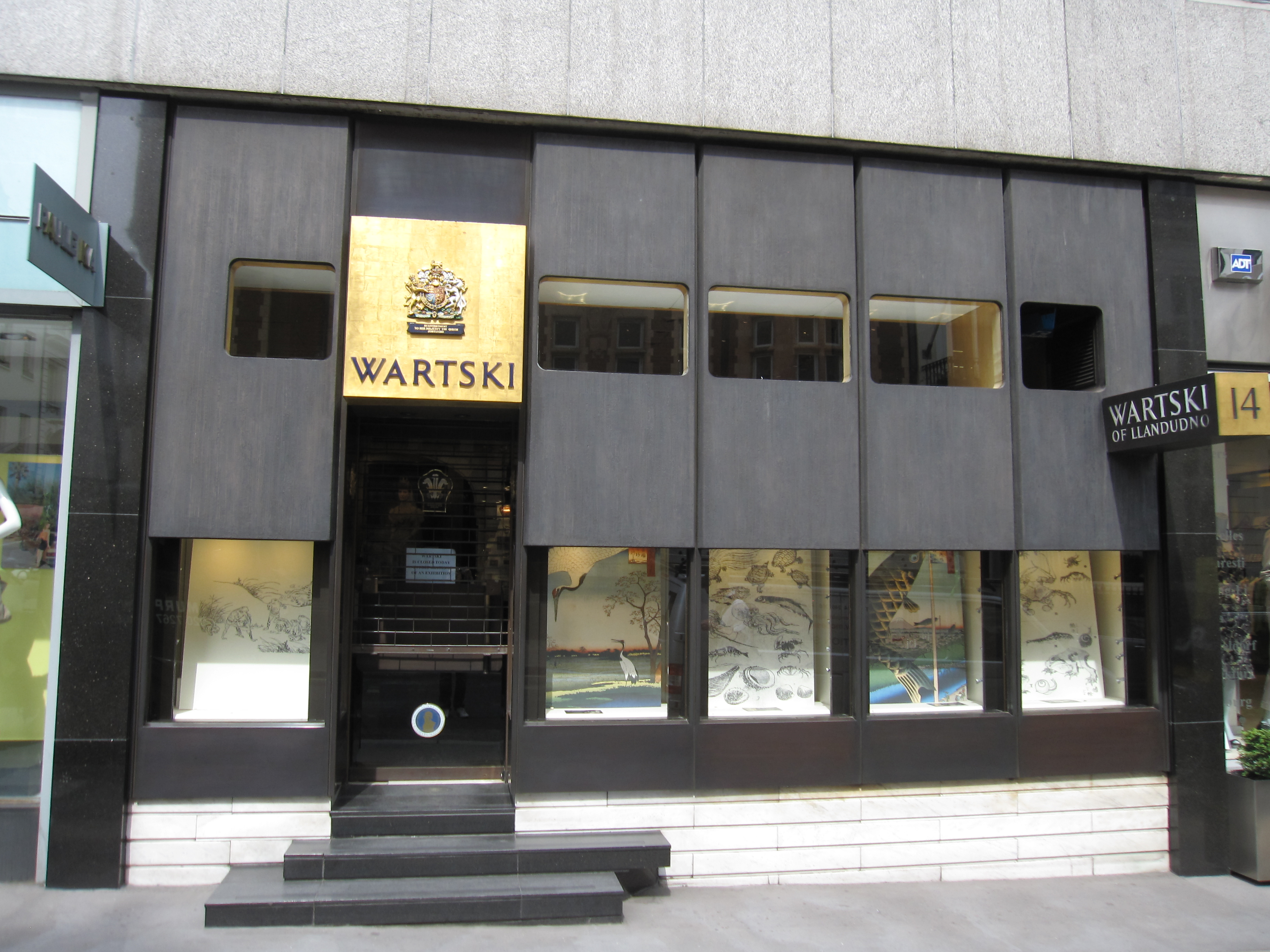
Wartski, Grafton Street, London

Emanuel Snowman OBE MVO (25 January 1886 – 27 February 1970) was a British jeweller, local politician and Jewish community leader. He oversaw the opening of the London branch of the Llandudno jewellers Wartski, having married the daughter of its founder, Morris Wartski, and went on to become its chairman.

== Early life ==
Emanuel Snowman was born in Hampstead, London, the son of Abraham Snowman (1849–1918), a picture dealer, and his wife Rachel, both of whom were born in Poland. His elder brothers were the prominent mohel and medical doctor Jacob Snowman and the painter Isaac Snowman. As a teenager he acted as secretary to Israel Zangwill. In 1898, he spent a year at the agricultural college at Mikve in Palestine where he met Theodor Herzl.

== Career ==
In 1911, Snowman managed the opening of the Regent Street, London, branch of his father-in-law's business, up until then only based in Llandudno, Wales. Whilst under the management of Snowman, Wartski received several Royal warrants, and Queen Mary was a regular customer.

== Purchases from Russia ==
From 1925, Snowman made regular visits to Russia. He often travelled with Armand Hammer and they both established good relations with the Soviet authorities, allowing Snowman to obtain many exceptional works of art, including nine imperial Fabergé eggs, intended for resale in London, which he acquired between 1925 and 1938. One of these was the 1913 Winter egg, which was the most expensive ever made, and which sold for a world record $9.6 million at Christie's in New York in 2002. Snowman's visits to the country continued until 1939.

The Tsarist government before the Russian Revolution had already tried to foster an interest in Russian decorative arts. After the Revolution, the new government faced a pressing need for hard currency and the sale of objects from the Church and the aristocracy was one way to raise funds quickly.

There was some discomfort amongst Russian émigré circles in London about the purchase of items that had previously belonged to Russian aristocrats or the royal family as although property confiscated by the Soviets could be legally sold, as the Soviet Government was internationally recognised, some of the items were identifiably the personal property of living individuals or relatives of the recently deceased.

In 1927, Snowman acquired about 80 items that had been sold in Paris by the Soviets. The Times commented pointedly that the "haul" could "be comfortably stowed away in a Gladstone bag" and that these were "things which the owners would have handled and treasured as personal belongings.

== Fabergé Imperial Easter eggs acquired by Emanuel Snowman ==
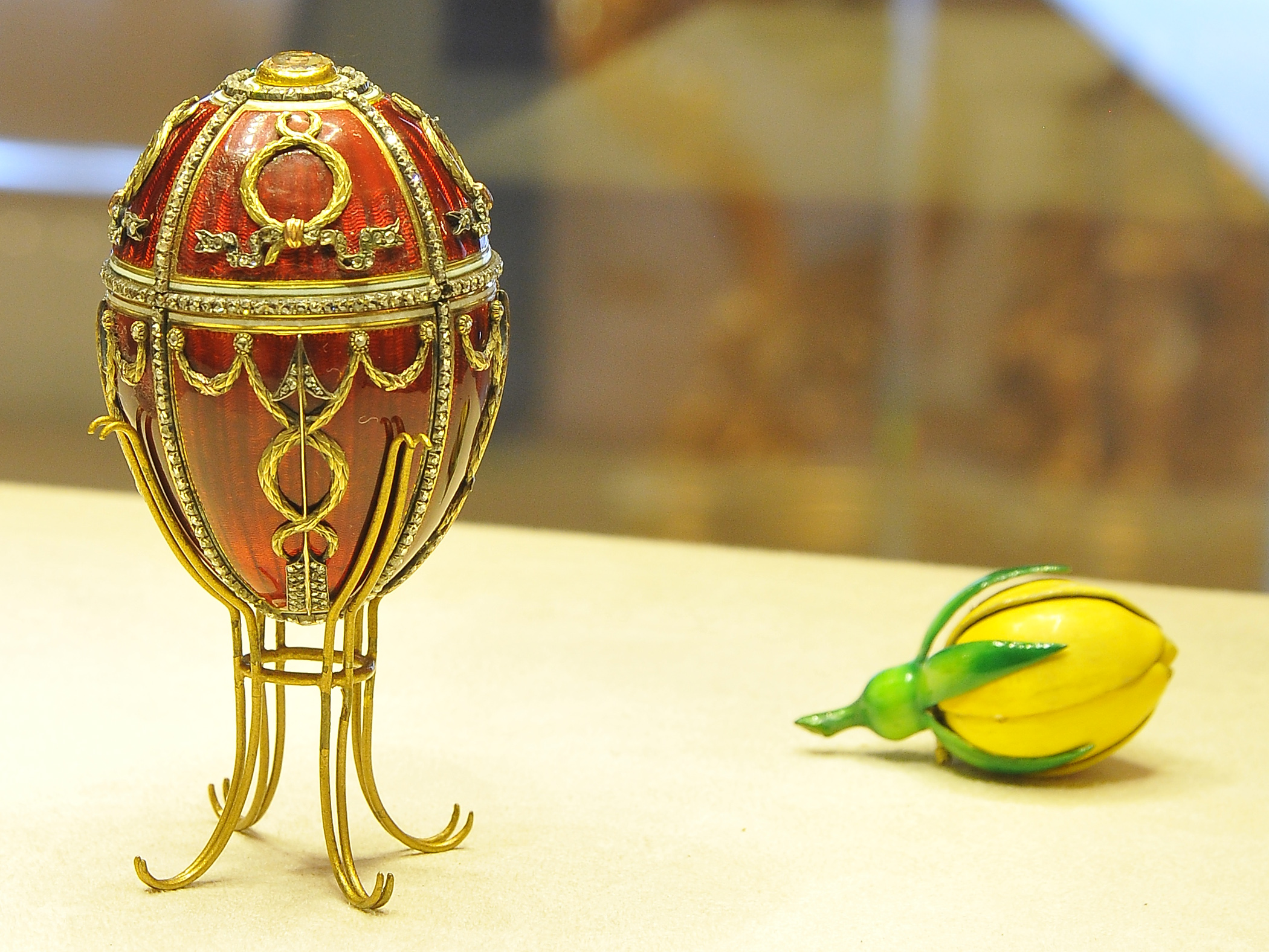
The Rosebud egg acquired by Snowman

Snowman acquired nine Imperial eggs:

- 1895 Rosebud
- 1897 Coronation
- 1898 Lilies of the Valley
- 1900 Cuckoo
- 1905 Colonnade
- 1906 Swan
- 1908 Peacock
- 1911 Orange Tree
- 1913 Winter

== Jewish community leader ==
Snowman was diligent in his religious duties and was warden of the Hampstead Synagogue, and chairman of the West Hampstead Day School. He was an early supporter of the Habonim Jewish Socialist-Zionist cultural youth movement and provided help to refugees from Nazi Germany. The Times said that "When many voices were silent ... he was an articulate and successful man of action and was directly responsible for the saving of many valuable lives."

== Honours ==
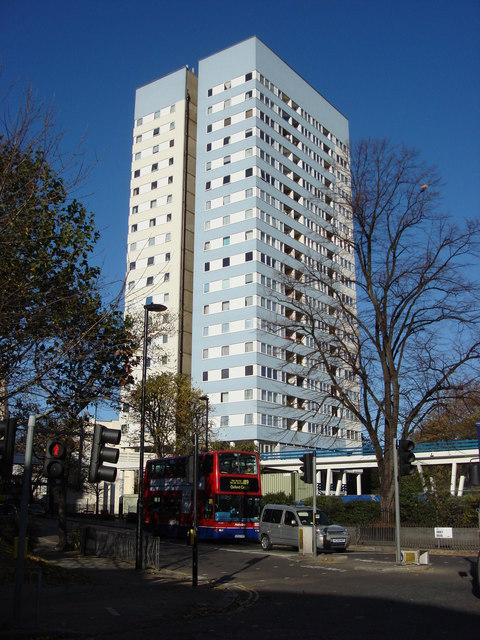
Snowman House, named after Emmanuel Snowman

Snowman was active in local politics: he was a Conservative councillor for the Priory ward on the Metropolitan Borough of Hampstead from 1937 to 1953, moving to Town ward in 1956 until the formation of Camden Council in 1964. Snowman was an alderman and, at one time, was mayor of Hampstead. In the 1957 Birthday Honours he was made an Officer of the Order of the British Empire (OBE), "for public services in Hampstead". Snowman became MVO in 1962. In the 1960s, a block of council flats on Abbey Road, West Hampstead, was named Snowman House in his honour.

== Personal life and death ==
Snowman married Harriet Wartski (1891–1985) in 1909, and their son Kenneth Snowman (1919–2002) in turn became chairman of Wartski, as has Kenneth's son, Nicholas Snowman (born 1944). They also had two daughters, Flora Joyce Snowman (1911–1996) and Charlotte Snowman (1914–2013).

Snowman died on 27 February 1970, aged 84.
