= Jacob Snowman =

British doctor and mohel

Jacob Snowman (24 November 1871 – 28 February 1959) was a British doctor and mohel, notable for having reportedly circumcised King Charles III in December 1948, and possibly other members of the British nobility and royal family.

Snowman was the son of Abraham Snowman (1849–1918), a picture dealer. He was the older brother to both painter Isaac Snowman (1873–1947) and jeweller Emanuel Snowman (1886–1970), who married into the prominent Wartski family of jewellers and became the company chairman. Wartski has enjoyed generations of Royal patronage, supplying the Welsh gold wedding bands for Charles and Camilla Parker Bowles, as well as the bands worn by Prince William and Catherine Middleton.

John Cozijn and Robert Darby, who is an historian of the British circumcision movement (though circumcision is now uncommon in the United Kingdom), have suggested that the British Royal Family invited Rabbi Snowman ("rabbi" is an honorific commonly afforded to mohels) to circumcise the infant Prince Charles at Buckingham Palace most likely because of his extensive experience with circumcision, and perhaps because non-Jewish family physicians were deemed less familiar or adept with the procedure (which was widely performed on British middle- and upper-class male infants from the 1890s through the 1940s). Darby and Cozijn have cast doubt on claims, arising in the 1990s and widely reported after the birth of Prince George in 2013, that a royal family "circumcision tradition" extends back to Queen Victoria's era, or even to George I in the early 18th century, grounded in secretive Davidic or British Israelist religious tradition.

Snowman wrote specialist articles and at least four books, including Jewish Law and Sanitary Science (1896), Clinical Surgical Diagnosis (Second English Edition, 1917), Lenzmann's Manual of Emergencies, Medical, Surgical and Obstetric: their Pathology, Diagnosis and Treatment (1919, based upon Emergencies in Medical Practice by Richard Lenzmann), a revised Manual of Emergencies, Medical, Surgical, and Obstetric (1926), A Short History of Talmudic Medicine (with thirteen editions between 1935 and 1974), and The Surgery of Ritual Circumcision (1904). The latter book was published in at least three distinct editions, the last appearing posthumously in 1962 under the co-authorship of his son Leonard Snowman (1900–1976).
