= Oskar Pihl =

Finnish silversmith and designer (1890–1959)

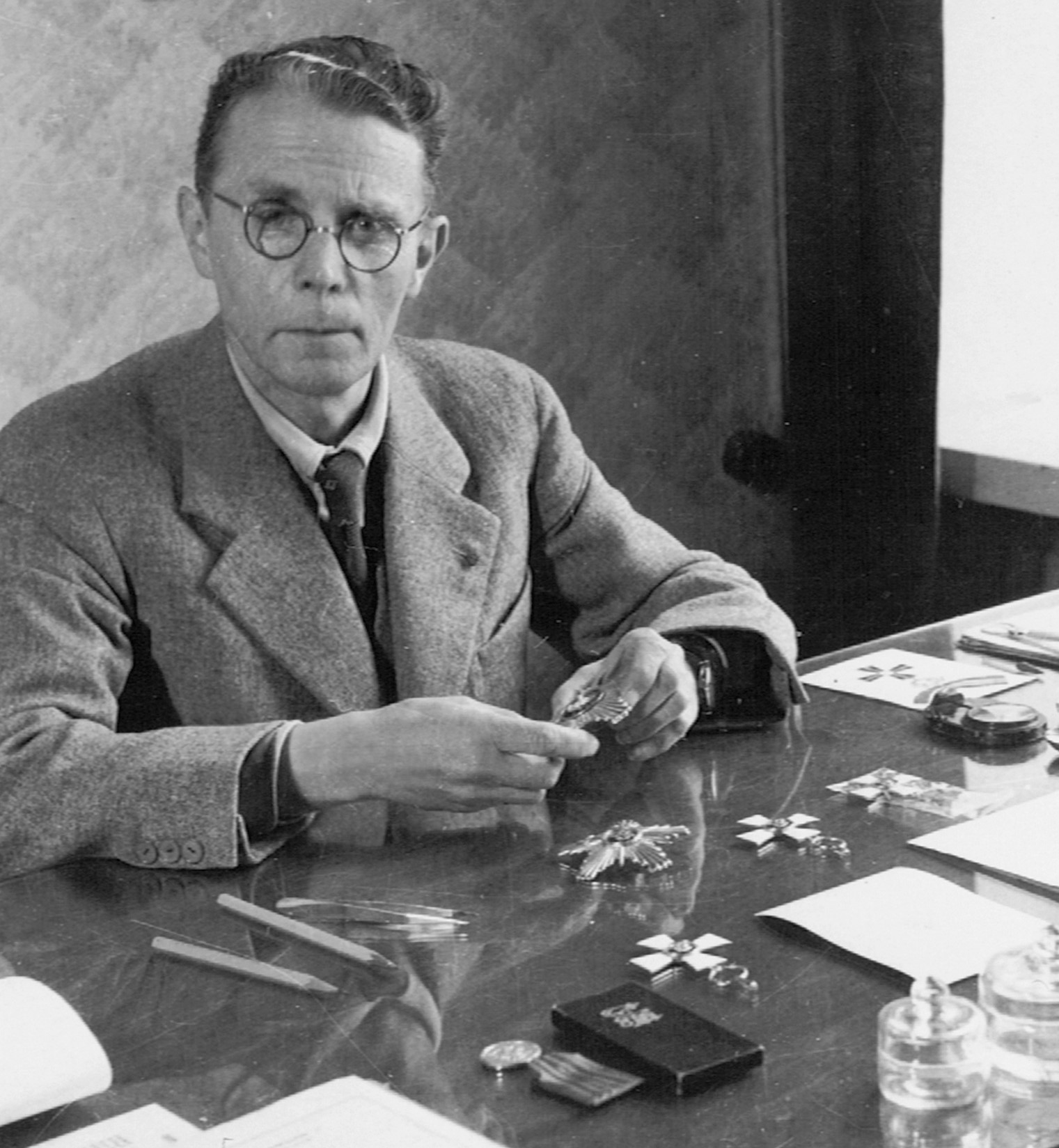
Oskar Pihl at work.

Oskar Woldemar Pihl (11 February 1890 in Moscow – 22 August 1959 in Helsinki) was a Finnish silversmith and Fabergé workmaster.

== Career ==
Oskar Pihl was born in Moscow, Russia, to a family of Finnish origin. He was the son of Knut Oskar Pihl and Fanny Holmström (1869–1949), a daughter of August Holmström. His sister was Alma Pihl, another Fabergé workmaster.

Pihl became a workmaster in August Holmström's workshop, where he made small items such as enameled tie pins. His hallmark is OP.

Pihl moved to Finland following the Russian Revolution.

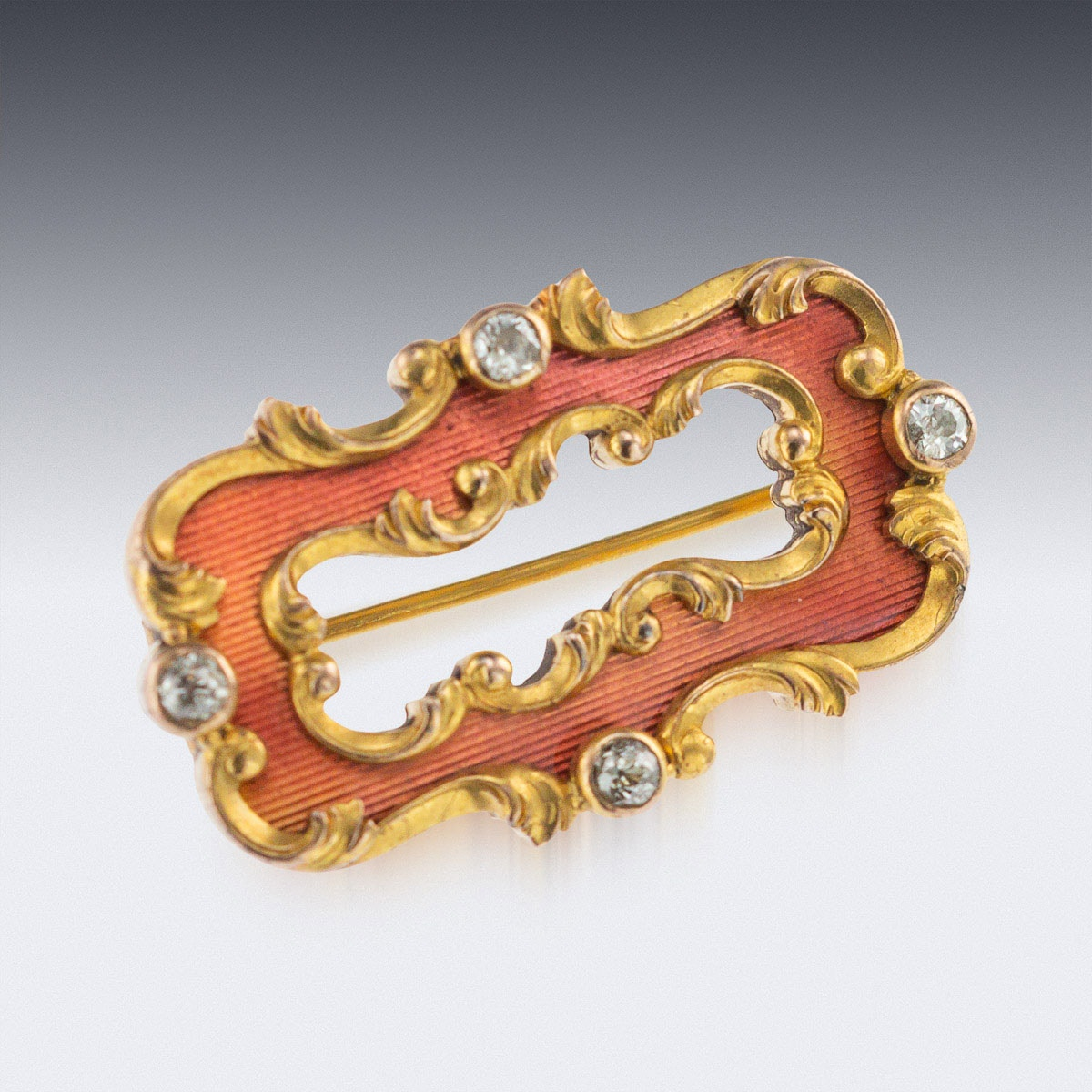
Gold and Enamel Brooch by Oskar Pihl
