= Alma Pihl =

Finnish designer and Fabergé workmaster

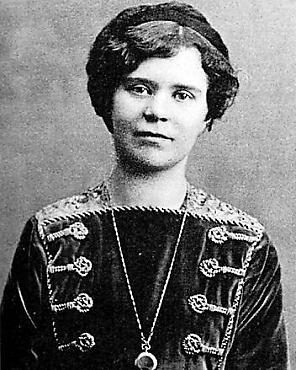
- Pihl in the 1910s
- Born: 15 November 1888; Moscow, Russia
- Died: 15 July 1976 (aged 87); Helsinki, Finland
- Education: Saint Petersburg Stieglitz State Academy of Art and Design
- Occupations: Fabergé workmaster; designer
- Notable work: Winter (Fabergé egg); Mosaic (Fabergé egg)
- Father: Knut Oskar Pihl
- Family: Oskar Pihl (brother); August Wilhelm Holmström (grandfather)

Alma Theresia Pihl-Klee (15 November 1888 – 15 July 1976) was one of the two female designers at Fabergé and one of the best known female Fabergé workmasters.

== Career ==
Alma Pihl was born in Moscow in 1888 to a family of Finnish origin. She was the daughter of goldsmith Knut Oskar Pihl (1860–1897), granddaughter of Fabergé head jeweler, August Holmström and the niece of Fabergé jewelry designer Hilma Alina Holmström (1875–1936), and sister of jeweler and goldsmith Oskar Woldemar Pihl. As a self-trained designer, she started to work for Fabergé in 1909.

She designed the famous Winter Easter Egg in 1913 and Mosaic Easter Egg in 1914, which now belongs to the collection of the British monarchy, and also many pieces of fine jewelry of which the most famous is a collection of snowflake jewelry designed for Emanuel Nobel.

Pihl moved to Finland due to the Russian Revolution at the age of 32. She worked at a Swedish-language school in Kuusankoski for nearly 25 years.

== Literature ==
- Bainbridge, H. C.: Peter Carl Fabergé: Goldsmith and Jeweller to the Russian Imperial Court. 1966.
- Hill, Gerard & Smorodinova G. G. & Ulyanova, B. L.: Fabergé and the Russian master Goldsmiths. 2008.
- Paro, Maj-Britt: Tant Almas hemlighet: Fabergékonstnären Alma Pihl. [Aunt Alma's Secret. Fabergé Artist Alma Pihl./ Biography in Swedish.] Helsingfors: Tore och Herdis Modeens stiftelse, 2012. ISBN 978-952-93-1573-4
- Seppälä, Anu: Jääkukkia keisarinnalle: Alma Pihlin uskomaton elämä. [Ice Flowers for the Empress. The Unbelievable Life of Alma Pihl. / Biography in Finnish.] Helsinki: Ajatus Kirjat, 2003. ISBN 951-20-6352-2
- Tillander-Godenhielm, Ulla: Fabergén suomalaiset mestarit [Fabergé's Finnish masters]. Helsinki: Tammi, 2011. ISBN 978-951-31-5878-1 (Lay summary in English.)
