= Isaac Snowman =

Anglo-Jewish artist

Isaac Snowman (1873 – 11 February 1947) was an Anglo-Jewish artist who made Jewish cultural themes his subject.

== Early life ==
He was educated at the City of London School. In 1890 he entered the Royal Academy School, where he gained a free medal, and afterward a scholarship in the Institution of British Artists. He showed his interest in Jewish matters by his drawings A Difficult Passage in the Talmud and The Blessing of Sabbath Lights, as well as by his Early Morning Prayer in the Synagogue.

His older brother Jacob Snowman was a London medical doctor and prominent mohel, who circumcised Charles, Prince of Wales and possibly other members of the British royal family. His younger brother was Emanuel Snowman, the jeweller, politician and community leader.

== Career ==
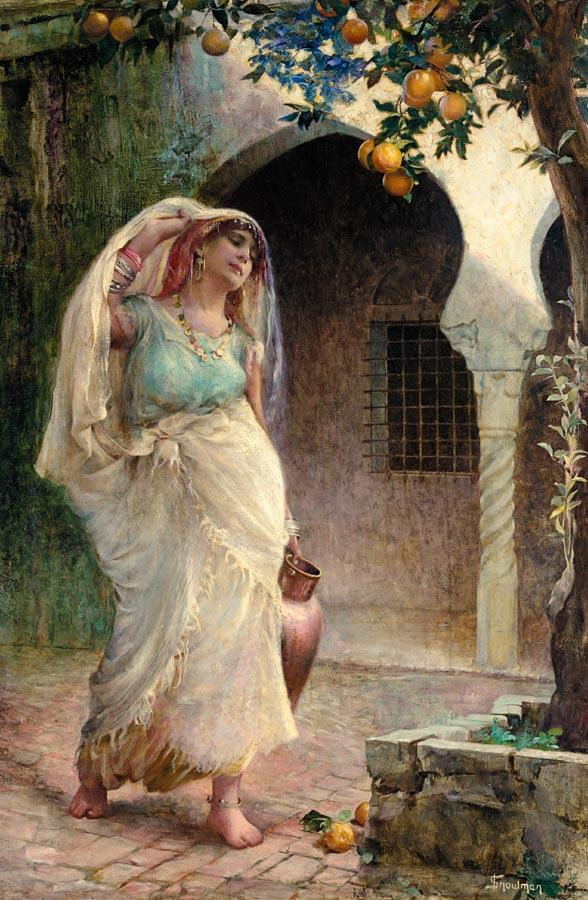
The Water Carrier by Isaac Snowman

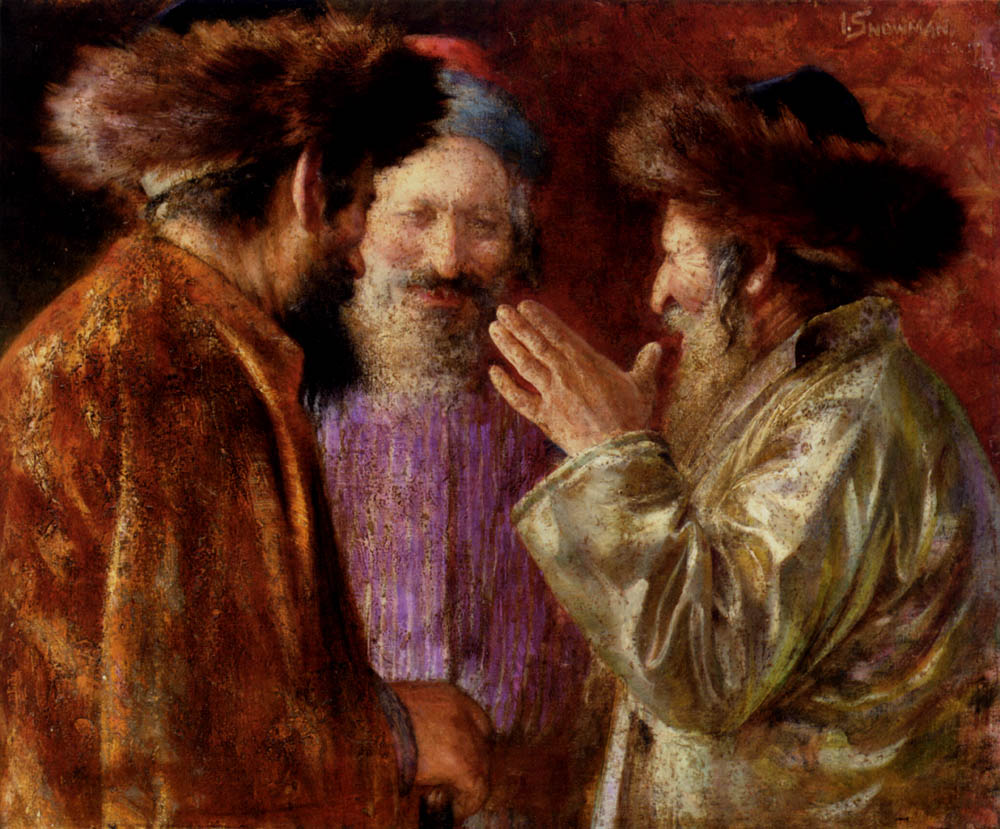
Three Rabbis of Jerusalem by Isaac Snowman

In the year 1897, he formed a group of English Jews known as the Maccabaeans, including Israel Zangwill and Herbert Bentwich, which undertook a pilgrimage to Palestine in the same year.

Out of all his paintings, which were devoted mainly to portraits and domestic views, Children's Voices (1901) attracted a great deal of attention, and The Bride (1904) was very popular at the time. He also exhibited a study of Sardanapalus, as well as The Wailing-Place at Jerusalem and The Proclamation of Joseph as Ruler of Egypt.

== Personal life ==
Isaac Snowman was married to Pearl Alexander at the North London Synagogue on 13 September 1898. According to the report in The Times the marriage was never a happy one for the wife owing to the husband's exaggerated views on the subject of "wifely obedience." They lived in Algiers and Hampstead, and after their son died they adopted a daughter.

In August 1907, Isaac Snowman left for Africa to execute a commission for the King of Dahomey. Subsequently, Pearl filed for divorce on grounds of statutory desertion and adultery, which was granted in June 1909.

Isaac, in the meantime, continued to build his career. He was commissioned to paint portraits of King George V and Queen Mary, and it was said he was one of the Queen's favourite artists. 21] Serious artworks enabled him to commission the first house on the now know Hocroft Estate to be built in Ranulf Road off Finchley Road. The house, now number 3, included dedicated artists work space: completed in about 1911, was for many years simply known as ‘The Studio’. Isaac sent five works to the R.A. from this 3 Ranulf Road. This area would have been well known to him, as it was just a few minutes walk from his old home in Fortune Green Road.

Isaac Snowman moved to Jerusalem, where he had a studio over the Damascus Gate. In the riots that occurred in Jerusalem on 2 November 1921, Snowman encountered a mob and, while trying to make his way through with two friends, was stabbed.

== Death ==
The outbreak of the Second World War found Snowman on a visit to England and his failing health prevented him from returning to his home in Jerusalem.

Isaac Snowman died peacefully on 11 February 1947, and his funeral was held the following day at Willesden Jewish Cemetery.

== Bibliography ==
- The New Era Illustrated Magazine, New York, Jan., 1905
- Jewish Year Book, 5665 (1904-5).
- The Palestine Post, Jerusalem, 17 March 1947 and 27 March 1949
- The Times, London, 10 June 1909 and 12 February 1947.
- The Jewish Chronicle, London, 28 November 1921
