= Winter (Fabergé egg) =

1913 Imperial Fabergé egg

Winter Egg Fabergé egg
- Year delivered: 1913
- Customer: Nicholas II
- Recipient: Maria Feodorovna

Design and materials
- Workmaster: Alma Pihl
- Materials used: Diamond, quartz, platinum, orthoclase, gold, demantoid
- Height: 102 millimetres (4.0 in)
- Surprise: Flower basket

The Winter Egg is a Fabergé egg, one of a series of fifty-two jewelled Easter eggs created by Russian jeweler Peter Carl Fabergé. It was an Easter 1913 gift for Tsarina Maria Feodorovna from Tsar Nicholas II, who had a standing order of two Easter eggs every year, one for his mother and one for his wife. It was designed by Alma Pihl.

The price in 1913 was 24,700 rubles, the most expensive Easter egg ever made. The egg left Russia after the Revolution, and ended up in the collection of Brian Ledbrooke, Esq. It was first sold at auction in 1994 at Christie's in Geneva for $5.6 million, the world record at that time for a Fabergé item sold at auction. The egg sold for US$9.6 million in an auction at Christie's in New York City in 2002. The buyer was a Qatari Prince, Saud bin Muhammed Al Thani, the country's Minister of Culture from 1997 to 2005. As part of the Classics Week series of auctions by Christie's, the egg was sold at auction on 2 December 2025, for £22.9 million. It was bought in the saleroom by Kieran McCarthy of Wartski, who was accompanied by his dog Drummer. Wartski, the London Fabergé dealers, first acquired the Egg from Soviet Russia in the 1930s.

== Design ==
The exterior of the egg resembles snowflakes and frost ice crystals formed on clear glass, set on a base of rock crystal shaped to resemble melting ice. It is studded with 1,660 diamonds, and is made from quartz, platinum, and orthoclase. The miniature surprise flower basket is studded with 1,378 diamonds and is made from platinum and gold, while the wood anemones flowers are made of white quartz and the leaves are made of demantoid. The flowers lie in gold moss. The egg is 102 millimetres (4.0 in) high.

== Sources ==
- Faber, Toby (2008). Fabergé's Eggs: The Extraordinary Story of the Masterpieces That Outlived an Empire. Random House. ISBN 978-1-4000-6550-9.
- Forbes, Christopher; Prinz von Hohenzollern, Johann Georg (1990). FABERGÉ; The Imperial Eggs. Prestel. ASIN B000YA9GOM.
- Lowes, Will (2001). Fabergé Eggs: A Retrospective Encyclopedia. Scarecrow Press. ISBN 0-8108-3946-6.
- Snowman, A Kenneth (1988). Carl Fabergé: Goldsmith to the Imperial Court of Russia. Gramercy. ISBN 0-517-40502-4.
