= Kenneth Snowman =

British jeweller and painter (1919–2002)

Kenneth Snowman CBE FSA
- Kenneth Snowman, 1919–2002.
- Born: Abraham Kenneth Snowman; 26 July 1919; Hampstead, London, England
- Died: 9 July 2002 (aged 82)
- Burial place: Willesden United Synagogue Cemetery
- Education: University College School
- Alma mater: Saint Martin's School of Art; Byam Shaw School of Art
- Occupations: Jeweller, painter, and the chairman of Wartski
- Spouse: Sallie Moghilevkine (m. 1942; died 1995)
- Children: Nicholas Snowman
- Parents: Emanuel Snowman (father); Harriet Wartski (mother)
- Relatives: Jacob Snowman (uncle); Isaac Snowman (uncle)

Abraham Kenneth Snowman CBE FSA (26 July 1919 – 9 July 2002) was a British jeweller, painter and the chairman of Wartski. He was made a Fellow of the Society of Antiquaries of London in 1994, and a Commander of the Order of the British Empire in 1997.

== Early life ==
Snowman was born in Hampstead, London, one of three children of the jeweller Emanuel Snowman and his wife Harriet Wartski, daughter of Morris Wartski, the founder of the Wartski art and antiques firm. His family was Jewish and originally came from Poland. Snowman was educated at University College School, Hampstead. Kenneth's father made regular trips to the Soviet Union, acquiring a total of nine Fabergé eggs between 1925 and 1938, which Kenneth played with as a child. He then studied at Saint Martin's School of Art and the Byam Shaw School of Art.

== Artistic career ==
Snowman painted throughout his life, exhibiting at the Royal Academy, the Paris Salon and the Leicester galleries. In September 1999, there was a retrospective exhibition of his work in Cork Street, London, at the dealers Browse and Darby. The painter Peter Greenham was a lifelong friend.

Snowman was highly critical of trends in modern art towards conceptualism and away from figurative art. In his 1993 chapter in Fabergé: Imperial Jeweller he railed against "fraudulent jumbles of brushstrokes and meaningless heaps of rubbish left on the gallery floor to be admired by the simple minded". He was optimistic, however, that the pendulum was now swinging the other way towards respect for "anything that shows evidence of work well done", for instance the work of highly skilled craftsmen working for Fabergé, Lalique and Cartier. Snowman acknowledged, however, that the work of Fabergé, for instance, could seem over-ornate and was not always to the modern taste. He made no comment regarding the cost of such items.

== Wartski career ==
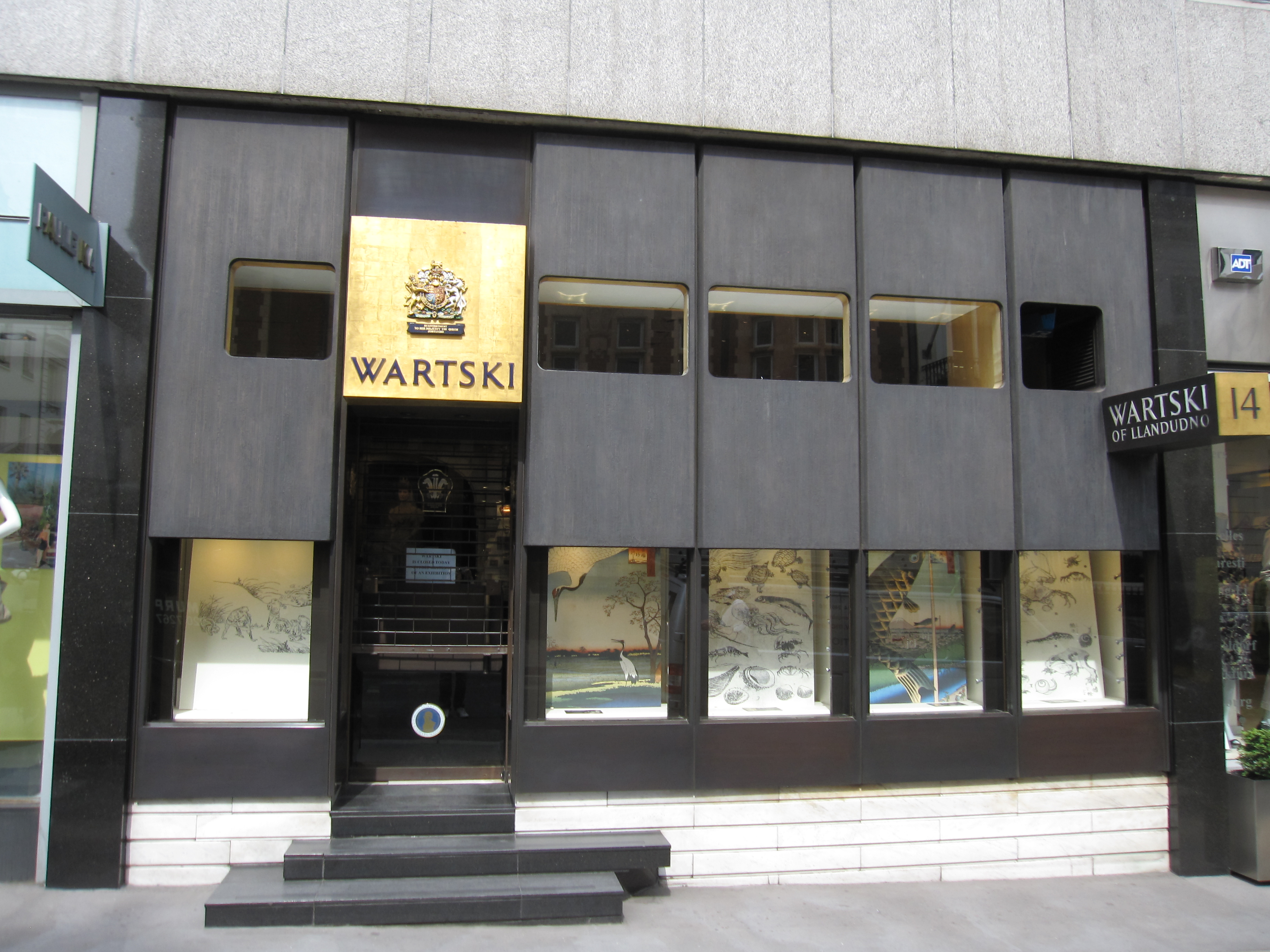
Wartski, Grafton Street, London

In 1940, after he married, Snowman entered the family business, rather than pursuing a career as an artist. Like his father, he was an enthusiastic dealer in the works of Carl Fabergé, and wrote a number of scholarly yet accessible books and catalogues on the subject, largely connected with the 1949 and 1953 exhibitions he arranged at Wartski. He also organised the major Fabergé exhibitions at the Victoria and Albert Museum in London in 1977, and at the Cooper-Hewitt Museum in New York in 1983.

Snowman was a friend of the novelist Ian Fleming, and is one of the few people to appear as himself in a James Bond story, The Property of a Lady, and the only one with an important role. The story was first published in a Sotheby's publication, The Ivory Hammer, in 1963 and later in the Fleming short story collection Octopussy and The Living Daylights. Fleming writes: "James Bond asked for Mr Kenneth Snowman. A good-looking, very well-dressed man of about forty rose from a group of men..." There is then a lengthy discussion about the Fabergé "Emerald Sphere" that is due to be auctioned the next day at Sotheby's and Snowman comments "We've got some pieces here my father bought from the Kremlin around 1927".

The story also forms the basis for the 1983 film Octopussy, where a Fabergé egg plays an important role, but Snowman's role there is conflated with another and becomes the character Jim Fanning, played by Douglas Wilmer. In the film, prior to the auction of the Fabergé egg, Bond visits the Wartski shop, then at 138 Regent Street, where Snowman/Fanning explains the history of Carl Fabergé's work, and then goes with Bond to the sale at Sotheby's.

== Personal life ==
Snowman married Sallie Moghilevkine in 1942, they remained married until her death in 1995. They had a son, Nicholas Snowman, co-chairman of Wartski since 1998–2002, and chairman since then.

== Selected publications ==
- The Art of Carl Fabergé. 1953.
- Eighteenth Century Gold Boxes of Europe. 1966.
- Eighteenth Century Gold Boxes of Paris: A Catalogue of the J. Ortiz-Patino Collection. 1974.
- Snowman, Abraham Kenneth (1979). Carl Fabergé, Goldsmith to the Imperial Court of Russia. Viking Press. ISBN 0670204862.
- Snowman, Abraham Kenneth (1993). Fabergé Lost and Found. H. N. Abrams. ISBN 0810933071.
- The Master Jewellers. 2002.
