= Wartski =

British family firm of antique dealers

Coordinates: 51.51028°N 0.14294°W

- Type: Limited company
- Industry: Jewellers and silversmiths
- Founded: 1882; 144 years ago
- Founder: Morris Wartski
- Headquarters: 60 St. James's Street, London, SW1A 1LE, England
- Area served: Worldwide
- Key people: Emanuel Snowman, Nicholas Snowman, Hector Snowman, Katherine Purcell, Kieran McCarthy
- Products: Fine Jewellery; Works of Art; Works by Carl Fabergé
- Website: Wartski.com

Wartski is a British family firm of antique dealers specialising in Russian works of art; particularly those by Carl Fabergé, fine jewellery and silver. Founded in North Wales in 1882, the business is located at 60 St James's Street, London, SW1. The company holds royal appointments as jewellers to Charles III, Queen Camilla and the late Queen Elizabeth II.

== History ==
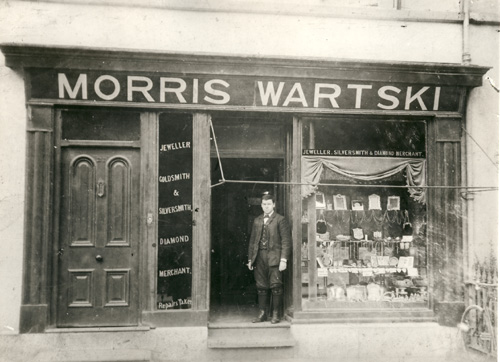
Morris Wartski's first shop on High Street, Bangor, North Wales

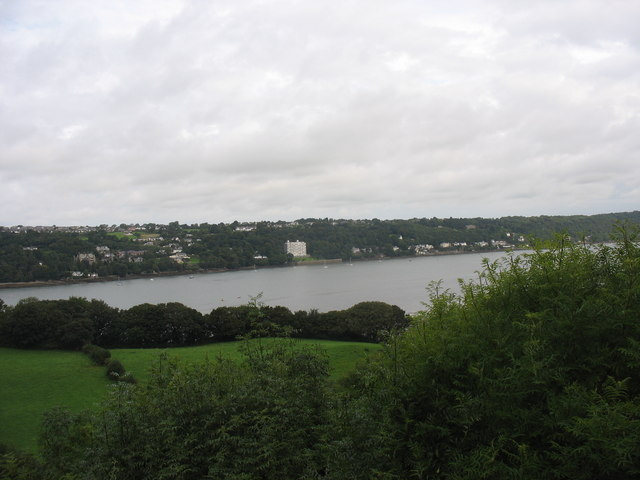
Wartski Fields in Bangor, Wales

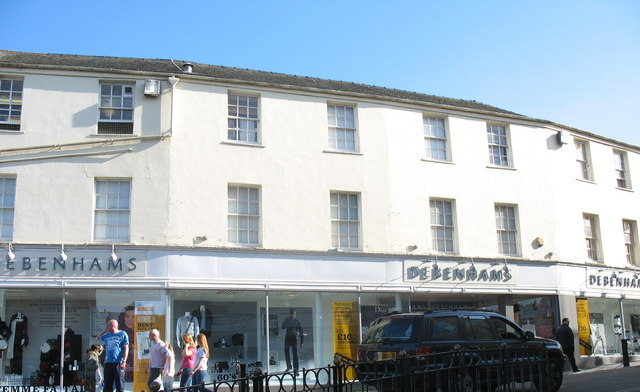
The former Wartski's department store in Bangor, North Wales, shown here as a Debenhams, in 2006

The firm was founded in Bangor, North Wales in 1882 by Morris Wartski, a Polish-Jewish immigrant from the town of Turek, in central Poland. Wartski first established a jewellery business on Bangor's High Street and then a drapery store. His son, Isidore, went on to develop the drapery business and create a large, fashionable store. He also developed the Castle Inn on High Street in Bangor, into the high-class Castle Hotel. He was a popular mayor of the city and a patron of local sports and charities. Wartski Fields were bequeathed to the city and people of Bangor by his widow, Winifred Marie, in memory of Isidore Wartski.

Another of Morris's sons went on to develop the jewellery part of the business into an international player. Morris Wartski's two sons, Harry and Charles, went into the business but when Charles was injured in a cycling accident, the business was moved in 1907 to the seaside town of Llandudno for the sake of his health. The Marquess of Anglesey was the best customer and David Lloyd George was engaged as the firm's lawyer. When Charles died in 1914, Harry ran the business with his father Morris and two brothers-in-law S. M. Benjamin and Emanuel Snowman.

After the death of Morris Wartski and Benjamin, Harry was joined in the business in Llandudno by his son, Charles Wartski, and a nephew, Cecil Manson. A second jewellery and antique establishment were opened on Mostyn Street, Llandudno. So fond of Llandudno was Harry Wartski that when the firm opened a branch in London's New Bond Street in 1911, it was given the name Wartski of Llandudno.

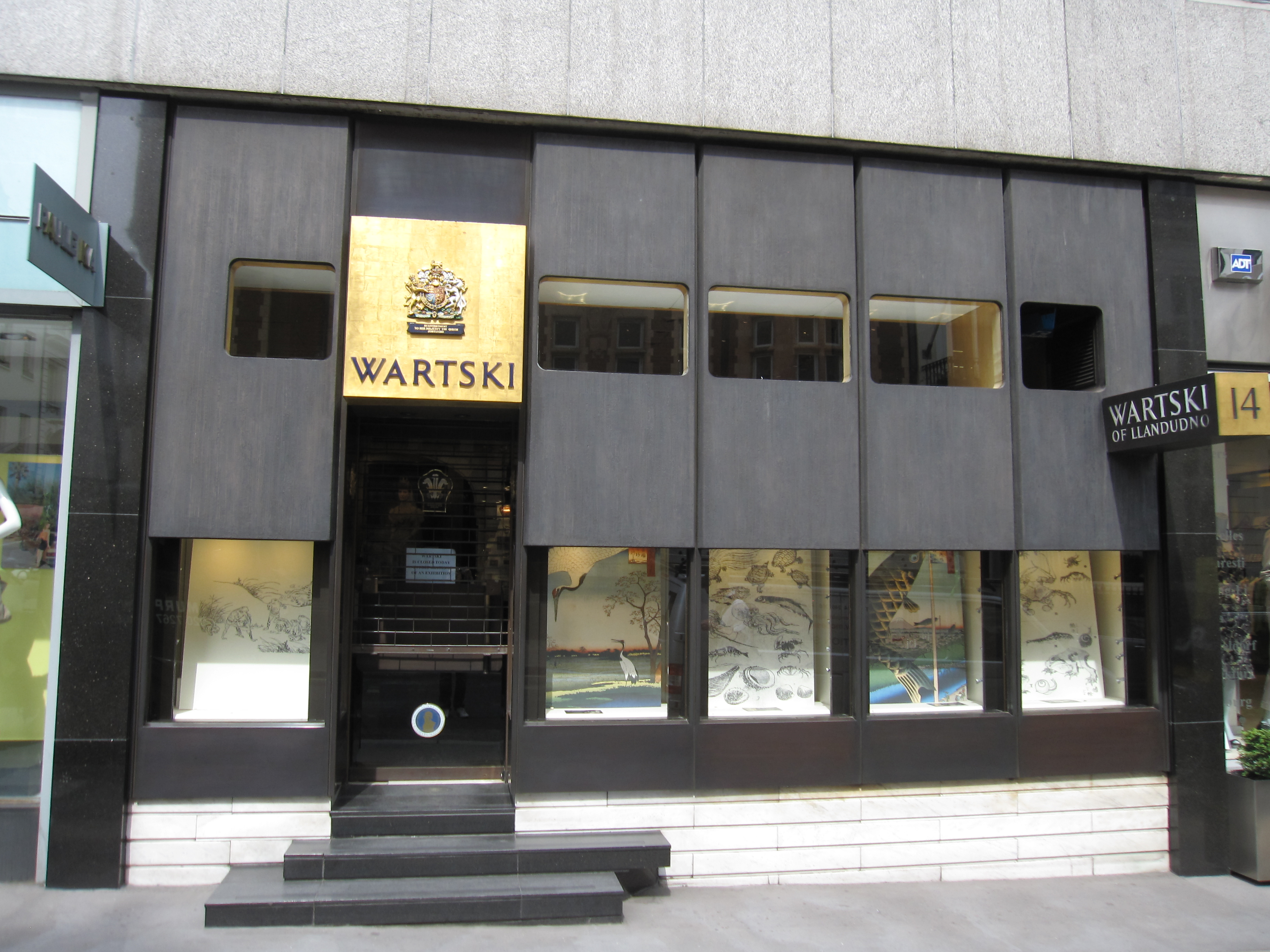
Wartski on 14 Grafton Street, London (2011)

The firm moved via premises in the Quadrant Arcade, Regent Street, 139 Regent Street and 14 Grafton Street, Mayfair. The firm's distinctive shop front on Grafton Street, designed by John Bruckland in 1974, was Grade II listed by English Heritage in 2012. It is a rare survival of innovative twentieth-century retail architecture in Mayfair. In 2018,Wartski moved to larger premises at 60 St. James Street, London; the concrete-lined interior was designed by the architects Waldo Works.

With the Russian Revolution, many of the aristocracies took with them large quantities of jewellery made by Carl Fabergé, jeweller to the Tsar. The pieces found their way into shops all over Europe. Harry Wartski painstakingly tracked them down and bought them for his shop. He and Snowman also bought some pieces from the Soviet government, whose collection attracted Royal patronage to the firm. Emanuel Snowman travelled to the Soviet Union from 1925 onwards to negotiate the purchase of former Romanov jewels and objets d'art from the Antiquariat, a commissariat established by the Bolsheviks to raise foreign currency.

When King Farouk was deposed, Kenneth Snowman (Emmanuel Snowman's son) went to Cairo to buy some of the Egyptian crown jewels, which also included many Fabergé pieces.

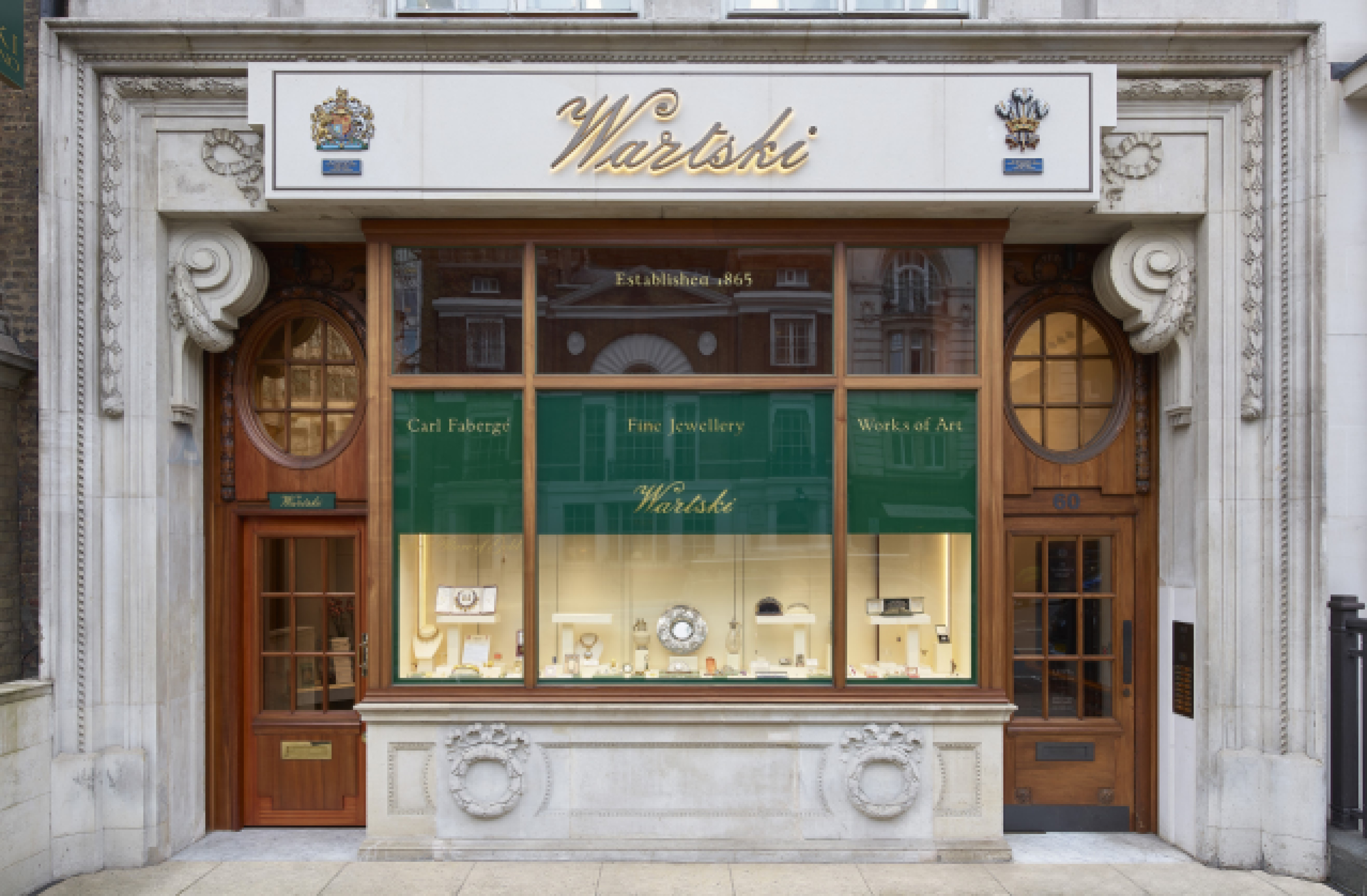
Wartski, 60 St. James's Street, London

(Abraham) Kenneth Snowman (1919–2002), ran the London shop and wrote standard works, The Art of Carl Fabergé (1953), followed by Carl Fabergé: Goldsmith to the Imperial Court of Russia and Eighteenth Century Gold Boxes of Europe (1966), written at the urging of Sacheverell Sitwell. As a curator, Snowman organised the exhibitions of Fabergé at the Victoria and Albert Museum (1977) and at the Cooper-Hewitt Museum, New York (1983). He was elected a Fellow of the Society of Antiquaries in 1994 and appointed CBE for his services to the arts and to charitable institutions in 1997.

=== Present-day ===
The firm remains in the Wartski family. It is owned by Hector Snowman, son of Nicholas, grandson of Kenneth and great-great-grandson of Morris Wartski. Katherine Purcell and Kieran McCarthy are joint managing directors of the company. Katherine Purcell is a Fellow of the Society of Antiquaries, Chairman of the Society of Jewellery Historians and a Liveryman of the Goldsmiths’ Company. Her speciality is French nineteenth-century jewellery and she has written articles on various subjects including the Parisian firm of jewellers Falize, the master of Art Nouveau René Lalique, and on the influence of Japanese works of art on Western jewellery and goldsmiths’ work. She authored the definitive study Falize: A Dynasty of Jewellers (1999) and translated into English Henri Vever’s French Jewellery of the Nineteenth Century (2001). Amongst the exhibitions she has curated for Wartski are ‘Fabergé and the Russian Jewellers’ (2006), ‘Japonisme: From Falize to Fabergé’ (2011) and ‘Fabergé – A Private Collection’ (2012).

Kieran McCarthy is a Freeman of the Worshipful Company of Goldsmiths, a Fellow of the Society of Antiquaries and a Fellow of the Gemmological Association. He is a member of the advisory board of the Fabergé Museum in St Petersburg. In 2014, he revealed the existence of the lost Third Imperial Fabergé Easter Egg and exhibited it for the first time in 112 years. Kieran has published widely and authored Fabergé in London (2017), an in-depth study of Fabergé’s London branch and its customers. His research led to him curating 'Fabergé in London: Romance to Revolution', the sell-out exhibition devoted to the subject at the Victoria and Albert Museum, November 2021 to May 2022.

Thomas Holman is the other director working at the firm. Geoffrey Munn was a previous managing director.

In 2011, Wartski made the ring for the wedding of Prince William and Catherine Middleton. The ring was fashioned from a piece of Welsh gold given to Prince William by Queen Elizabeth II. Previously in 2005, Wartski made the wedding rings for the wedding of Prince Charles and Camilla Parker Bowles.

Wartski were the sole sponsor of 'Bejewelled Treasures', an exhibition of Indian and Indian-influenced jewellery from The Al Thani Collection staged at the Victoria and Albert Museum from November 2015 to March 2016.

In July 2018 Wartski sponsored the book Designers & Jewellery 1850–1940: Jewellery & Metalwork from the Fitzwilliam Museum by Helen Ritchie which accompanied an exhibition of the same name held at the Museum.

An exhibition of engraved gems entitled ‘Multum in Parvo’ (a Latin motto which translates as 'much in little'), was staged at Wartski in October 2019. Curated by Thomas Homan, it included works by the most notable gem engravers of the 18th and 19th centuries and several gems from the fabled collection of George Spencer, 4th Duke of Marlborough and Classical antiquity. A collector queued day and night outside the shop over the weekend before it opened in order to be the first to view the show.
