= Carbyne (company) =

Israeli technology company

Carbyne Ltd.
- Formerly: Reporty Homeland Security
- Type: Private
- Industry: Technology
- Founded: 2015; 11 years ago
- Founders: Amir Elichai; Alex Dizengoff; Lital Leshem; Pinchas Buchris; Yony Yatsun
- Headquarters: New York City, United States
- Key people: Amir Elichai (CEO and Chairman)
- Products: Emergency communication solutions
- Website: carbyne.com

Carbyne Ltd. (formerly Reporty Homeland Security) is an American and Israeli technology company that develops emergency communication technologies. Carbyne provides real-time video, location, and data transmission for emergency response systems worldwide. Its platform supports public safety answering points (PSAPs) to receive critical information from callers. The company is headquartered in New York City with R&D operations in Tel Aviv.

A pending acquisition of the company by Axon Enterprise (formerly TASER International) was announced in November 2025 and was expected to close in early 2026.

Carbyne's technology has been adopted by emergency services in 23 U.S. states and several other countries, including deployments in cities such as Miami, Atlanta, New Orleans, New York City and by agencies in Mexico and Colombia. In Israel, its platform has been used by the Tel Aviv and Jerusalem municipalities and the volunteer emergency organization United Hatzalah.

== History ==
Carbyne was founded in April 2015 by Amir Elichai (who serves as CEO), along with Alex Dizengoff (CTO), Yony Yatsun, Ehud Barak and Lital Leshem under the name Reporty Homeland Security. The startup initially developed a platform for live video streaming and geolocation data for emergency call centers.

The company rebranded to Carbyne in early 2018 – a name referencing an extremely strong allotrope of carbon. By 2018 Carbyne had raised about $24 million in venture funding (including backing from Founders Fund, the first Israeli startup in that fund's portfolio) and was valued near $100 million.

In April 2019, the company began collaborating with Cisco, the network equipment giant, to incorporate their hardware into its systems. Two months later, Carbyne announced a partnership with Google to integrate Android phone location services into emergency command centers across Mexico.

Carbyne established its headquarters in New York City in October 2019 while maintaining R&D operations in Tel Aviv, and it expanded with offices in the United States, Mexico, Europe, India, and Ukraine.

In 2025, it secured a $100 million funding round led by strategic partners like AT&T, and reported deployments in roughly 300 emergency response centers worldwide.

In November 2025, Axon Enterprise agreed to acquire Carbyne for $625 million in cash, intending to integrate Carbyne's AI-powered 911 technology into Axon's public safety ecosystem to enhance connected response capabilities.

== Products ==
Carbyne develops cloud-based "Next Generation 911" (NG911) solutions aimed at modernizing emergency communication. Its platform enables real-time transmission of rich data from callers to public safety answering points (PSAPs). For example, when a distress call is made, Carbyne's system can provide the 911 dispatcher with the caller's precise GPS location, live video feed from the caller's smartphone camera, audio streaming, text messaging, and other telemetry in parallel with the voice call. The company offers both an app-based service and an app-free option. With the Carbyne mobile app (previously called “C-Now”), users can pre-install it on iOS or Android to automatically send video and location data during an emergency call.

Alternatively, Carbyne's web-based feature (known as "C-Lite") allows a 911 center to text an auto-generated URL link to a caller, which when tapped activates the phone's camera and streams video and location to the dispatcher, without requiring the caller to have any app installed. Both methods are cloud-native and work with legacy 911 infrastructure by creating an over-the-top data channel, enabling quick deployment with minimal changes to existing call centers. Carbyne claims its technology can significantly improve response efficiency (reducing emergency response times by up to 65% on average) by providing first responders with critical situational information before they arrive on scene. The platform also includes capabilities for indoor positioning (to locate callers inside buildings) and integration of additional data sources such as IoT sensors or surveillance feeds to give a comprehensive picture of an incident in real time.

Carbyne's services are built on a secure cloud (using Amazon Web Services) and are claimed to be compliant with data protection regulations like GDPR, with all data transmitted over encrypted channel. The company emphasizes that 911 centers using Carbyne cannot access a caller's camera or microphone without the user's explicit consent (the caller must accept the video link or app permissions). Major telecom and public safety partners have integrated Carbyne's solutions, such as AT&T as part of their NextGen 911 offerings, Amazon for its SaaS offerings, and Google for Android's emergency location service.

== Leadership ==
Carbyne's leadership and board include several notable figures from both the tech sector and government. The company's co-founder and Chief Executive Officer and Chairman is Amir Elichai, an Israeli entrepreneur who conceived the idea after experiencing a slow emergency response when he was mugged, and who previously served as an officer in the Israel Defense Forces special forces. Another co-founder, Alex Dizengoff, acts as Chief Technology Officer, overseeing development of the platform. Two additional founding team members were Yony Yatsun and Lital Leshem, the latter of whom had a background in Israeli intelligence and private security ventures; however, Leshem has not been active in the company's management since 2017.

== Investors ==
At start-up, former Israeli Prime Minister Ehud Barak invested approximately US$1 million in the company in 2015 and assumed the role of chairman. Haaretz reported that a large part of that money was supplied by disgraced financier and sex-offender Jeffrey Epstein. Barak publicly admitted to the partnership with Epstein. In 2020, the company announced board changes, and that the former Prime Minister was no longer on the company's board.

International tech investor Nicole Junkermann joined the board in 2017 after her venture capital fund invested in Carbyne, and U.S. businessman Andrew Intrater (CEO of Columbus Nova) acquired a stake in the company in 2017. Peter Thiel's venture firm Founders Fund became an early backer in 2018. Former United States secretary of homeland security Michael Chertoff also was a board member.

Carbyne raised US$25m in Series B funding in 2021, including David Petraeus, US$56m in Series C funding in 2022, and US$100m in Series D funding in 2025, including from AT&T.

== Privacy risks ==
Civil liberties organizations have cautioned that emergency services platforms like Carbyne's must implement strong privacy safeguards to prevent misuse of sensitive data. For instance, the ability to live-stream 911 callers' cameras, while potentially life-saving, also raises privacy concerns. Carbyne has responded by highlighting its consent-based activation and security measures, and by emphasizing the public safety benefits of its system.
