= Lady R incident =

US and South Africa 2022 diplomatic dispute

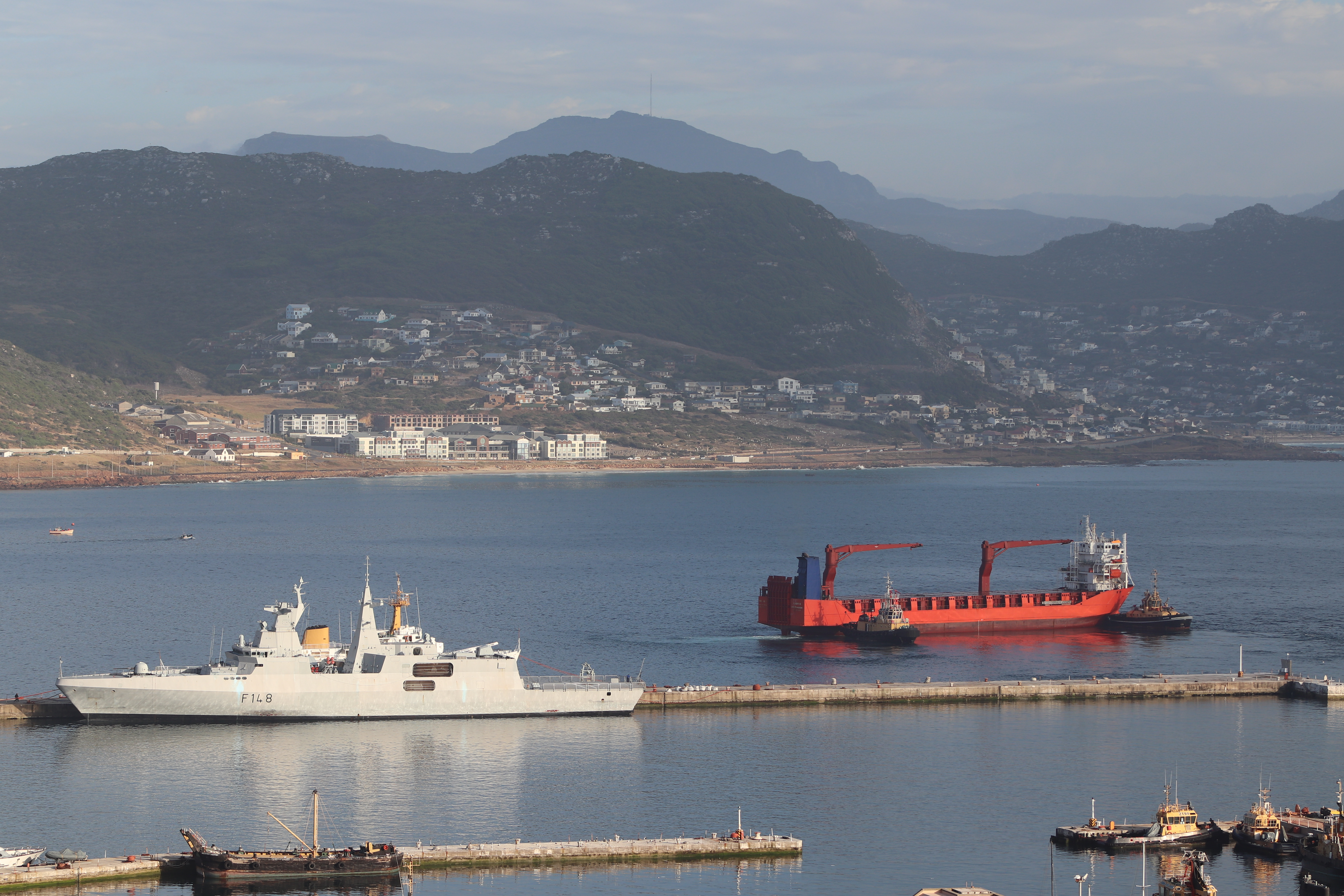
Lady R (vessel with the red hull, right) being tugged away from Naval Base Simon's Town on 9 December 2022, SAS Mendi (left) can be seen in the foreground.

The Lady R incident, also known as #LadyRussiagate, refers to the docking of the sanctioned Russian cargo ship Lady R at Simon's Town Naval Base in South Africa in December 2022 and the resulting diplomatic impact. The ship was carrying military cargo. The incident is controversial for the secretive nature of the docking and an allegation by the United States ambassador to South Africa that South African military supplies were loaded onto the ship for use in Russia's invasion of Ukraine.

== Background ==
=== Lady R ===
Lady R (IMO 9161003) is a Russian-flagged roll-on/roll-off type cargo ship built in 2004 by the Türkiye Gemi Shipbuilding company in Istanbul, Turkey. Prior to 2019, it was named Sloman Producer. It has a typical draught of 4.4 metres (14 ft 5 in), a length of 123 metres (403 ft 7 in) and a beam of 19 metres (62 ft 4 in). The ship uses a 5,760 kW (7,720 hp) MAN-B&W type engine. It uses the call sign UBDT8 and has the IMO / MMSI numbers 9161003 / 273212120. The ship has a recorded gross tonnage of 7,260 and a summer deadweight tonnage of 7,630 tons. As of 2024, it is registered in Astrakhan, Russia.

=== South African position on the Russian invasion of Ukraine ===
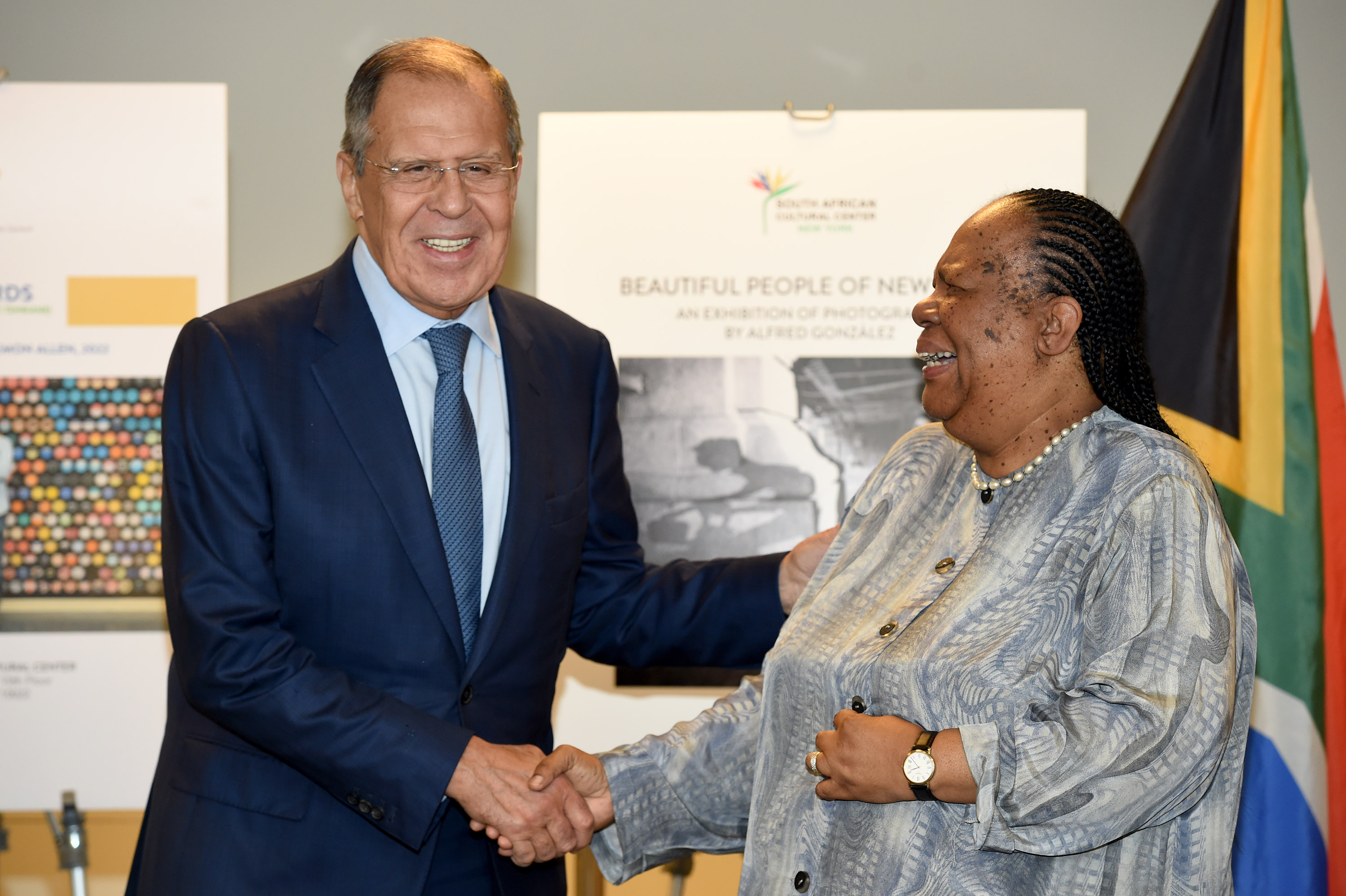
Russian Foreign Minister Sergey Lavrov (left) and South African Foreign Minister Naledi Pandor (right) on 22 September 2022.

Following Russia's 2022 invasion of Ukraine wide-ranging sanctions were imposed on Russia by the United States, Canada, and numerous countries in Europe and the Asia–Pacific regions. On 8 May 2022 Lady R was listed as one of two Russian cargo ships sanctioned by the United States for its involvement in the transport of munitions from North Korea to the Russian Federation in support of Russia's invasion.

Prior to the December 2022 docking of Lady R in Simon's Town, the South African government's position on the invasion of Ukraine had drawn criticism for being unofficially friendly towards Russia whilst official neutral. Although South Africa initially condemned Russia's invasion it retracted the statement and instead declared official neutrality. Despite the invasion and resulting international diplomatic condemnation Russian-South Africa relations have remained strong with South Africa being one of 35 countries to abstain from a subsequent United Nations vote demanding that Russia withdraw from Ukraine.

The country's governing political party since 1994, the African National Congress (ANC), has been criticized by some in South Africa for being too supportive of Russia. The ANC received $826,000 from United Manganese of Kalahari (UMK) mines in 2022, a company that Russian oligarch Viktor Vekselberg and the ANC party's investment arm, Chancellor House, have invested in.

== Docking at Simon's Town Naval Base ==
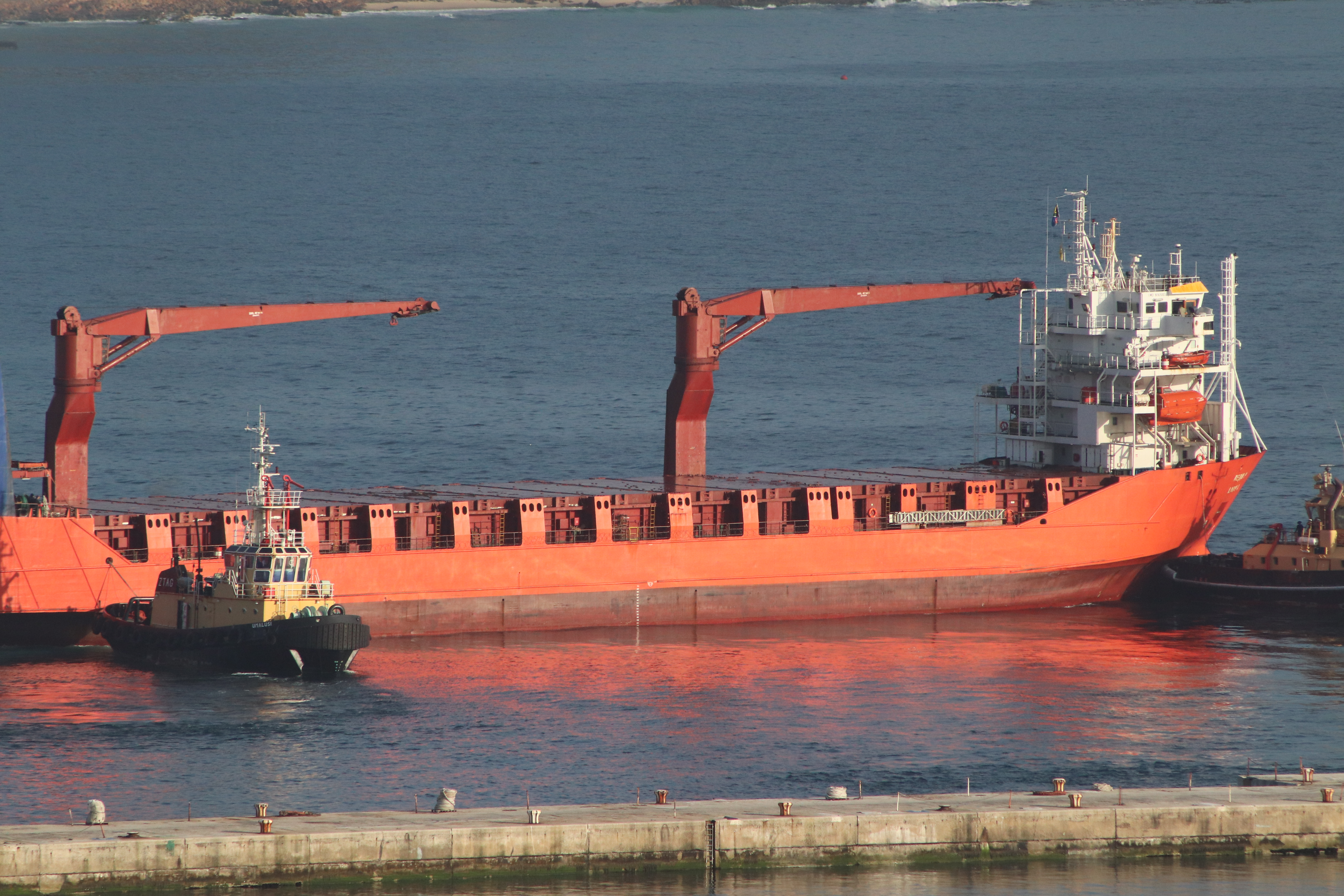
Russia's Lady R disembarking Simon's Town Naval Base early on Friday, 9 December 2022 following its secretive and controversial docking.

In October 2022 Lady R started its voyage from the Black Sea port of Novorossiysk en route to the port of Dar es Salaam, Tanzania. Sometime between 8 pm and 10 pm on Tuesday, 6 December 2022, halfway through its circumnavigation of Africa, Lady R docked at the Naval Base in Simon's Town, South Africa. The ship had turned off its marine tracking system south of Agulhas on 5 December 2022, and its arrival was unexpected and controversial. The ship was loaded and unloaded with cargo under armed guard at night under the cover of darkness as the country experienced a planned national rolling blackout on 8 December. The ship left early the next day on Friday, 9 December 2022 and completed its journey to Dar es Salaam in February 2023. The docking was shrouded in secrecy, and neither the South African nor Russian governments commented on it at the time.

There was significant speculation at the time about whether or not this was an instance of South Africa supplying weapons to Russian forces in support of Russia's invasion of Ukraine. Two weeks later, following repeated questions about the docking, Defence and Military Veterans Minister Thandi Modise stated that Lady R was offloading an old, outstanding order for ammunition.

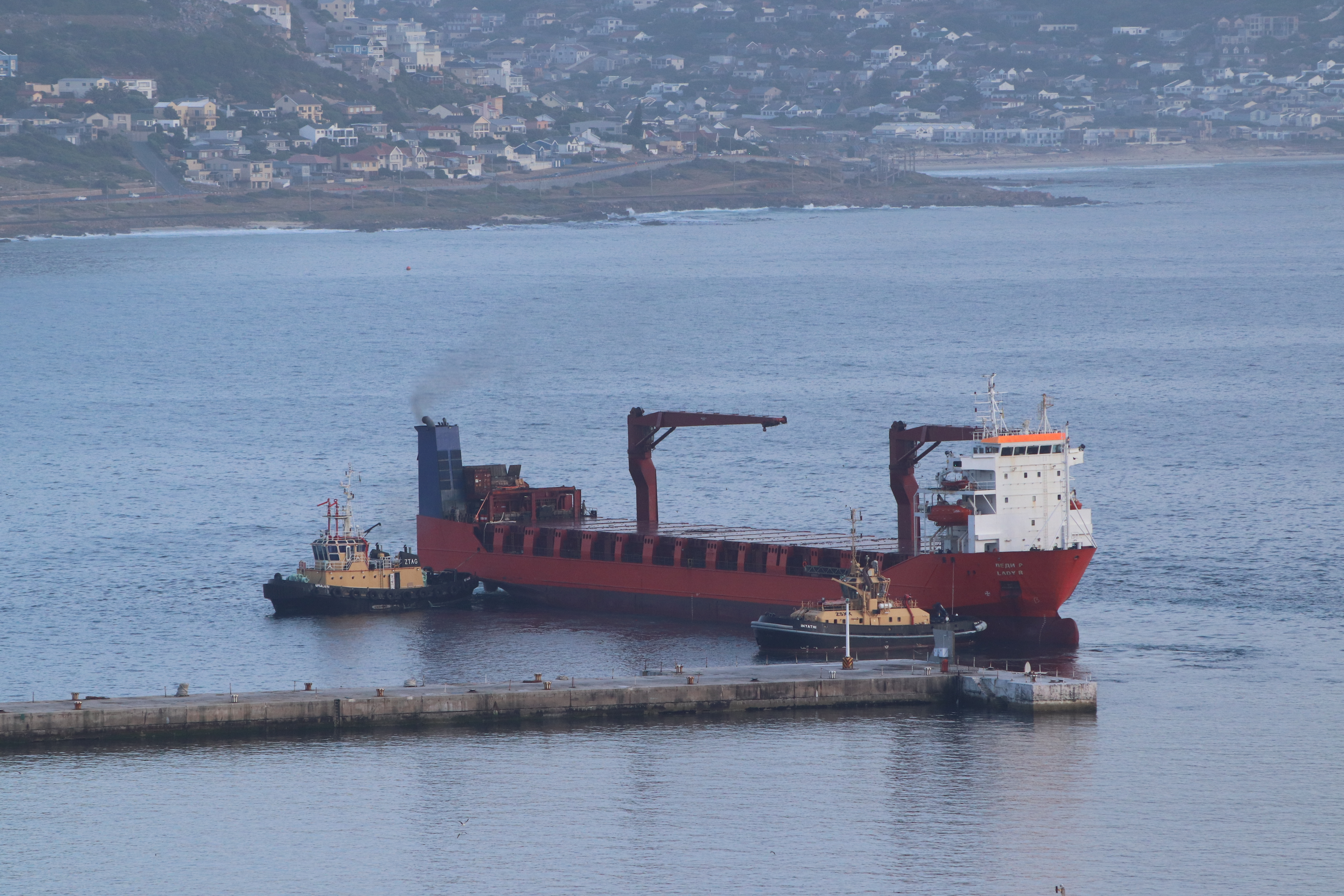
Lady R leaving Naval Base Simon's Town

Witnesses observed that six shipping containers were loaded on to the ship before midnight on 8 December just prior to its departure.

Lady R's arrival in South Africa came at a time of heightened tensions between Russia and the West over Russia's invasion of Ukraine and South Africa's unwillingness to criticize the invasion despite its policy of supporting a rules based international order.

== 2023 accusation by the American ambassador ==
On 11 May 2023, the United States ambassador to South Africa, Reuben Brigety, accused the country of supplying arms to Russia during the December 2022 docking of Lady R. During the same announcement, ambassador Brigety also stated that the ANC, the governing political party of South Africa, had been unresponsive to repeated American attempts at dialogue and that the ANC's policy document on the war in Ukraine was "hostile" to the government of the United States. Ambassador Brigety went on to say that this indicated that South Africa was "not non-aligned", contrary to South Africa's officially proclaimed non-aligned position on the Russian invasion of Ukraine.

The docking of Lady R, along with other incidents of South Africa-Russia cooperation, further strained South Africa's relationship with the US and other Western countries whilst increasing skepticism in the West of South Africa's self-proclaimed non-aligned or neutral position on the war in Ukraine. Prior to ambassador Brigety's accusation South Africa had also hosted the naval exercise Mosi II with Russia and China which coincided with the one year anniversary of Russia's invasion of Ukraine, and allowed the secretive landing of a US-sanctioned Russian cargo aircraft at the Waterkloof Air Force Base.

Roughly two weeks before ambassador Brigety's accusation, South Africa had sent a delegation to Washington, D.C. to advocate for the continuation of the country's inclusion in the African Growth and Opportunity Act (AGOA), during which the American government claims they had raised concerns with the South African delegation about the country arming Russia.

=== Reaction in South Africa ===
South Africa denied the allegation and stated that the country's interaction with Lady R was consistent with its non-aligned position on the war in Ukraine. South African President and President of the ANC Cyril Ramaphosa stated that an independent inquiry would be launched to investigate Brigety's accusation. South Africa démarched ambassador Brigety and claimed that Bridgety later apologized for the statement. Following the accusation, South African Finance Minister Enoch Godongwana stated that US Treasury Secretary Janet Yellen had informed him in February 2023 of American suspicions that South Africa had supplied arms and ammunition to Russia when Lady R docked.

Four days after ambassador Brigety's accusation, the commander of Russia's ground forces, general Oleg Salyukov, met with chief of the South African army lieutenant general Lawrence Mbatha to discuss issues of military cooperation and combat readiness. South Africa denied that the meeting was connected to the diplomatic incident resulting from Lady R docking and stated that the trip was planned before Brigety's statement.

At an ANC political event, President Ramaphosa later stated that his government found Brigety's accusation "distasteful" and as "an attack" on South Africa by not following normal diplomatic processes but stated that talks with the ambassador thereafter were cordial.

South Africa's largest opposition party, the Democratic Alliance, accused the ANC government of secretly supplying weapons to Russia in return for secret funding for the ANC's re-election campaign in the 2024 general election. Stating that unless one considered the possibility of Russian funding for the ANC, South Africa's support for Russia in its war against Ukraine "made no sense." South Africa's third largest political party, the Economic Freedom Fighters, rejected the accusation, called for the immediate dismissal of ambassador Brigety, accused the US of spreading propaganda, and stated that if "guns [...] were given to Russia [then] it was a good thing."

The South African civil society group Organisation Undoing Tax Abuse (OUTA) demanded that the South African government publicly share information on what cargo was loaded onto Lady R and be more transparent about South African arms sales generally. The South African academic and criminologist Guy Lamb asserted that, assuming South Africa acted in accordance with its own laws, it was highly unlikely that South Africa loaded arms or ammunition onto Lady R.

The diplomatic incident caused speculation over whether the United States would be continuing South Africa's preferential trade status with the country through the AGOA, thereby possibly inflicting significant damage to South Africa's economy. There was also speculation that the incident might also threaten the continued status of PEPFAR in South Africa. The value of the South African Rand declined from R18.8 per US dollar on 10 May to R19.3 per dollar by 18 May, a decline that was attributed to the incident. In May 2023, South African Minister of Defence and Military Veterans Thandi Modise insisted "there was fokol [Afrikaans: nothing] on that ship".

At least two South African journalists stated that if the claims are proven false, Ambassador Brigety should be either ousted or punished for making unsubstantiated claims.

=== Reaction in Russia and Ukraine ===
Russia responded by stating that their government "expressed their intention to further intensify mutually beneficial relations" in a possible attempt to exploit the situation. The Russian government later described ambassador Brigety's accusation as "totally fabricated and as false" whilst comparing it to Colin Powell's 2003 presentation to United Nations Security Council falsely accusing Iraq of having WMDs.

Ukrainian president Volodymyr Zelenskyy responded to the incident by stating that he had spoken with President Ramaphosa two days after ambassador Brigety's accusation about "the peace formula [for the war], about justice, and about how our world should be united by the rules of international law." President Zelenskyy also stated that “anyone who helps the aggressor [Russia] with weapons will be an accomplice with all consequences” in possible reference to the event.

== Inquiry findings ==
In May 2023, Ramaphosa named a three-person panel to investigate the incident. The South African government published the executive summary of the findings but kept the full report secret arguing that it needed to maintain military security. The inquiry, headed by former judge Phineas Mojapelo, found that whilst the ship had delivered weapons from Russia to South Africa, there was "no evidence to support the claim that the ship transported weapons from South Africa destined for Russia."

The inquiry also found that the South African government was unaware that the sanctioned Russian ship was heading to South Africa until it neared South African waters and that it was redirected to Naval Base Simon's Town after the port at Ngqura-Port Elizabeth refused to service the sanctioned ship. The inquiry also noted the role of the United Arab Emirates in facilitating the weapons transaction, and that the ship had turned off its identification transponder as it was being tracked by unnamed foreign intelligence agencies. The inquiry concluded that because the US sanctions were not endorsed by the United Nations, they were not binding on South Africa.

According to journalist Thulani Mpofu, "A South African government inquiry into whether weapons were loaded onto a Russian ship in December 2022, as claimed by a US diplomat, has established that a European company had in fact been uploading food onto the vessel."

Both the South African and US governments sought to smooth relations following the publication of the inquiry. The US government stated that it appreciated the South African government's interest in investigating the incident but made no comment on the finding of the inquiry. The director of the African Defence Review, Darren Olivier, stated that the inquiry's findings raised "more questions than it answers" and that it was unlikely that it would close the issue. Since docking in South Africa, Lady R has reportedly docked multiple times at North Korean ports, with the US alleging that it was transporting weaponry and military equipment to Russia to be used in support of that country's invasion of Ukraine.

== See also ==
- Russia–South Africa relations
- South Africa–United States relations
- South Africa–Ukraine relations
- Russian shadow fleet
