= Andrew Intrater =

American businessman

Andrew Lewis Intrater (born 1962) is an American capital investor.

== Career ==
Intrater manages the investment firm Sparrow Capital, formerly known as Columbus Nova, which was the only American affiliate of the Russia-based firm Renova Group, where he also served on the board of directors. Renova Group is owned by Intrater's cousin, the Russian oligarch Victor Vekselberg. Columbus Nova's biggest asset at the time was a controlling stake in CIFC, a publicly traded company that managed credit investments. Together with Israel's former prime minister Ehud Barak, Intrater was on the board of CIFC. CIFC was sold in 2016 for US$333 million (~$425 million in 2024) to F.A.B. Partners, an investment vehicle of Qatar's royal family. Vekselberg's assets were frozen due to the economic sanctions against Russia.

He serves on the executive committee of Steven Spielberg's Shoah Foundation. He holds a Bachelor of Science in chemical engineering from Rutgers University.

=== Political affiliations ===
Intrater had close ties with Michael Cohen, Donald Trump's long time personal lawyer, who received a US$1,000,000 consulting contract from Intrater's firm Columbus Nova. Intrater also paid US$250,000 to attend the 2017 inauguration ceremony of Donald Trump. The lawyers of Stormy Daniels, including Michael Avenatti, believed that he contributed to her hush money payment. Intrater also donated to the campaign of Madison Cawthorn, another right-wing newcomer of the Republican Party.

== Private life ==
Intrater was born in New York and raised in New Jersey. His family originates from Drohobych in today's Ukraine. His father was a survivor of the Holocaust. He speaks English, Russian and Polish.

== See also ==
- Guy Caspi
- Benny Gantz
- Lanny Davis
