= Guy Caspi =

- Occupation: Data Scientist
- Notable work: Deep Instinct (founder)

Guy Caspi is an America-based serial entrepreneur. He was one of the members of Israel Defense Forces' elite cyber team.

== Early life and career ==
Capsi was born and raised in Rehovot, Israel.

Between 2005 and 2011, Capsi served as vice president and chief business officer in the Israel and US branches of Mavenir Systems which was previously Comverse technology.

He has served has president and general manager at Comverse Technology (Verint Group).

In 2011, Capsi co-founded Tamares Telecom, and served as its CEO till 2013.

== Deep Instinct ==
In 2015, Caspi along with Eli David and Nadav Maman, co-founded Deep Instinct, a company that applies artificial intelligence's deep learning to cybersecurity.

== Fifth Dimension Holdings ==
Also in 2014, he founded Fifth Dimension Holdings, a company that developed predictive analytics systems used by security agencies and called itself the "technology leader in law enforcement investigation and analysis solutions" because it provided big data in real time through a unified investigation platform to utilize advanced analytics for assisting police analysts and investigators to solve many cases faster. In 2015, Yaron Eitan (Note: Yaron Eitan founded Geotec and DVTEL, which was an advanced video surveillance that develops visible and thermal cameras and their encoders and servers along with integrated video management software and was purchased by FLIR Systems for $92 million in November 2015.) became a board member of Fifth Dimension. In 2015, Viktor Vekselberg's Columbus Nova made large investments in Fifth Dimension when Benny Gantz was its chairman. (Note: At the end of 2018 after spending NIS 250 million over four years, Fifth Dimension ceased its operations in December 2018 because of investment problems in the United States with Viktor Vekselberg associated assets worth nearly $2 billion including Renova Group and its affiliate Columbus Nova that were frozen in May 2018 according to Ram Ben-Barak who was on the Fifth Dimension advisory board until 2017.) Guy Caspi left Fifth Dimension Holdings in 2016.
