= Columbus Nova =

Investment company

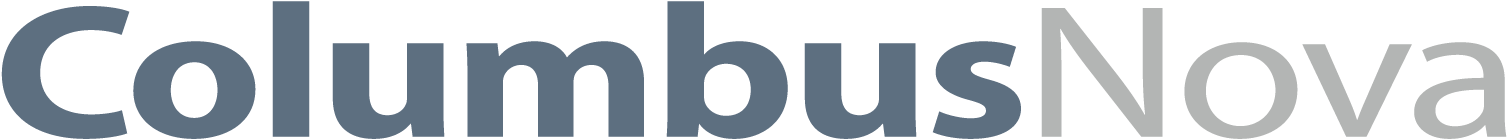
- Type: Private
- Industry: Investment
- Founded: 2000; 26 years ago
- Founder: Andrew Intrater
- Headquarters: New York City, New York, U.S.
- Key people: Andrew Intrater (CEO)
- Website: columbusnova.com

Columbus Nova is an investment company founded in 2000 by Andrew Intrater, who serves as the company's chief executive officer and is cousin to Russian oligarch Viktor Vekselberg.

== History ==
On September 17, 2013, online music service Rhapsody International announced that it would accept a "significant" investment of an undisclosed amount from Columbus Nova Technology Partners. At the same time, it was announced that Rhapsody president Jon Irwin would step down and the company would lay off some of its workers.

Former senior managing partner Jason Epstein also owns Daybreak Game Company, Harmonix, the makers of Guitar Hero, whom he bought from Viacom in December 2010.

In 2015, Columbus Nova made large investments in Chairman Benny Gantz's Fifth Dimension, a real time predictive analysis firm used by security agencies. Fifth Dimension was founded in 2014 by deputy Chairman of the Board Doron Cohen. Late in 2018, Fifth Dimension ceased its operations.

In 2017, Mother Jones reported that Andrew Intrater donated $250,000 to Trump's inauguration fund and $35,000 to a joint fundraising committee for Trump's re-election and the Republican National Committee.

=== Connection to Viktor Vekselberg and payments to Michael Cohen ===
According to The Washington Post, "Columbus Nova has been described in federal regulatory filings as an affiliate of the Renova Group, founded by Russian billionaire Viktor Vekselberg". The sanctioned Russian company Renova Group, itself controlled by Vekselberg, also subject to U.S. sanctions, has previously listed Columbus Nova as an affiliate investment manager under the Renova Group's umbrella. Per regulations administered by the United States Department of the Treasury's Office of Foreign Assets Control (OFAC), companies that are at least 50% owned by sanctioned individuals or companies are themselves subject to U.S. sanctions. Columbus Nova stated that, while Renova Group had been their largest client, they had never been part of Renova Group, and had been "100 percent owned by U.S. citizen" since its inception.

On May 8, 2018, The New York Times reported that during 2017 Columbus Nova made payments of at least $500,000 to a bank account maintained by Michael Cohen, then acting as President Donald Trump's personal attorney. However, the sanctions against Renova Group were not put in place until April 6, 2018, so even if Columbus Nova were subject to sanctions due to its ownership structure, payments from Vekselberg to Donald Trump (via Cohen) would not have been expressly prohibited by OFAC at the time the payments were made. Subsequent reporting by The New York Times noted that the Mueller report did not name Intrater or Vekselberg and quoted Intrater as saying, "The fact that I’m not even mentioned in the Mueller report confirms what I knew all along — that I’ve done nothing wrong."

As reported in The New York Times, on July 1, 2019, Intrater and his Columbus Nova entity sued the United States Treasury Department's Office of Foreign Asset Control (OFAC) claiming that OFAC's "50% rule" - whereby any property owned 50% or more by a sanctioned person is itself subject to sanctions also known as blocking - is unconstitutional as applied to Americans who have an interest in such property. The New York Times article also noted that "If successful, the lawsuit could break new legal ground. Carlton Greene, a former senior Treasury official who worked in the office overseeing investigations into sanctions violations and is now a partner at Crowell & Moring, said past lawsuits had raised Fourth Amendment issues but none made it a central argument. "I think a Fourth Amendment argument for property blocked in the U.S., for a party with constitutional rights, is an argument that the government would have to take seriously," Greene said.
