= South Africa–Ukraine relations =

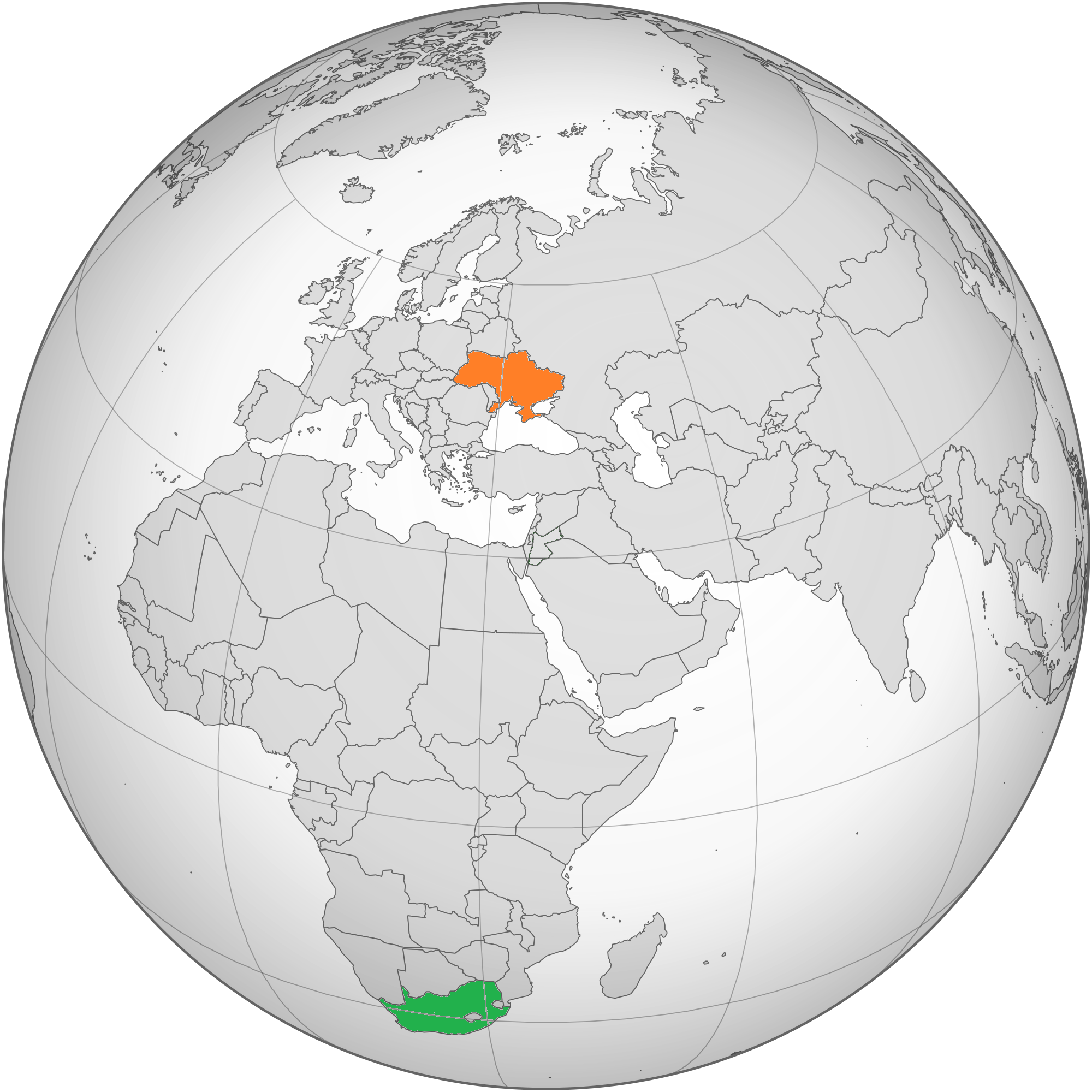
- South Africa: Ukraine

Envoy
- Ambassador André Groenewald: Ambassador Liubov Abravitova

South Africa–Ukraine relations refers to the current and historical relations between South Africa and Ukraine. South Africa established an embassy in Kyiv in October 1992 while Ukraine established an embassy in Pretoria in 1995.

== Overview ==
=== Russo-Ukrainian War ===
South Africa has avoided criticising Russia's 2014 annexation of Crimea and instead argued for solidarity amongst BRICS nations.

Although initially critical of the Russian invasion of Ukraine, South Africa sought to repair and maintain friendly relations with Russia. President Ramaphosa stated that South Africans "in the main" support the South African government's neutral position on the war.

South Africa was one of 35 countries that abstained from voting on a United Nations condemnation of Russia's invasion of the country, a stance that Ukrainian Ambassador to South Africa Liubov Abravitova described as "puzzling", "unacceptable" and "alarming." Said ambassador later stated that her country was finding it difficult to engage with the South African government on the issue due to a lingering goodwill towards Russia, citing the Soviet Union's assistance to the anti-apartheid struggle as the reason, something the ruling African National Congress (ANC) views as being provided by Russia.

On 20 April 2022, South African president Cyril Ramaphosa and Ukrainian President Volodymyr Zelenskyy discussed the war, seven weeks after Ramaphosa discussed the war with Russian President Vladimir Putin. The length of time between Ramaphosa's discussions with the two and the reported difficulty that the Ukrainians had in organising the meeting was cause for controversy.

A March 2022 draft resolution presented by South Africa to the United Nations was criticised by Ukraine as favouring Russia without consulting Ukraine. This draft resolution omitted any mention of Russia's aggressive actions towards Ukraine. Instead, an alternative resolution proposed by France and Mexico that explicitly mentioned Russia as the aggressor was adopted. South Africa is not a signatory to the joint communique supporting the territorial integrity of Ukraine following the Russian invasion.

On 21 February 2025, Ramaphosa confirmed that South Africa had invited Ukraine's President Zelenskyy for a state visit. The visit began on 24 April, but was cut short due to an attack on Kyiv.

=== Response in the Western Cape ===
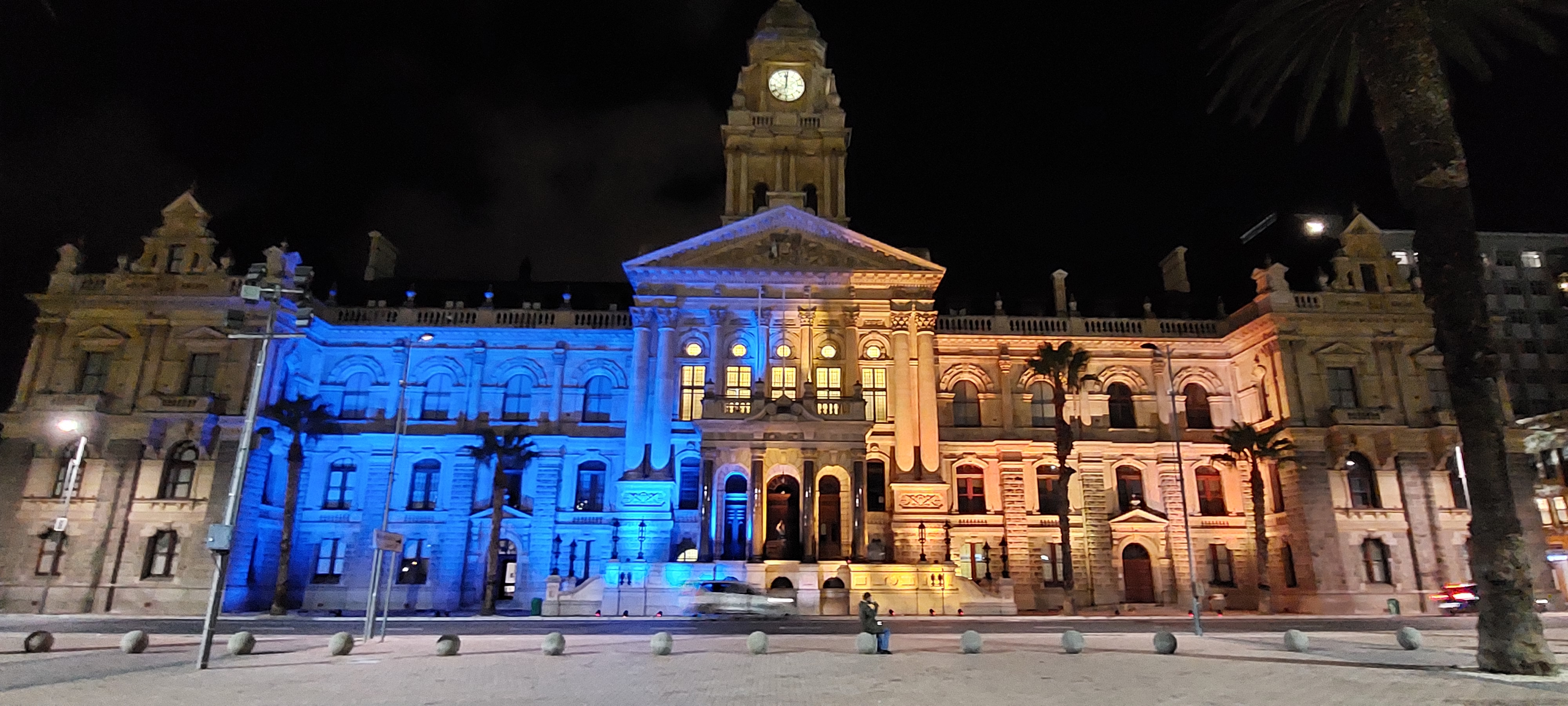
Despite the South African government's position on the Russian invasion, Cape Town City Hall was lit up in the colours of the Ukrainian flag to show the city's solidarity with Ukraine.

Domestically, the South African government's position was controversial among its citizens. The Western Cape Government (headed by the opposition party Democratic Alliance) lit up the provincial government buildings and the Cape Town City Hall in the blue and gold of the Ukrainian flag in support of the country. The mayor of Cape Town, Geordin Hill-Lewis, pledged support on 2 March for the city of Kyiv and all Ukraine during the war, and called on his nation's government as well as governments worldwide to "do more for peace to be restored and for the unprovoked and illegal aggression against the Ukrainian people to be halted." The ANC and Al Jamah-ah parties were reportedly opposed to the City Hall's lighting ceremony.

The Western Cape provincial cabinet later passed a resolution to condemn the Russian invasion in support of Ukraine, as well as the clampdown on protest within Russia against the war. The condemnation also included a boycott of the events or meetings hosted by the Russian Embassy and Consulates, as well as a refusal to invite them to the Western Cape Government's own events or meetings.

Following the issue of an arrest warrant for Putin following the invasion the Western Cape Government announced that should Putin enter the province then provincial law enforcement would arrest him. This was counter to the national government which had invited Putin to attend a BRICS conference in South Africa later in 2023.

=== African Peace Mission ===
On 16 June 2023, Cyril Ramaphosa visited Kyiv, the first visit by a South African leader, as part of the African Peace Mission to Ukraine.

== Economy ==
In 2008, South Africa was ranked second (after Ghana) among all African countries in terms of products exported to Ukraine. In that year, trade between the two countries had grown 5.4 times to $375.1 million. By 2021, South Africa exported R434.83 million (US$28.98 million) and imported R730.10 million (US$48.67 million) worth of goods to and from Ukraine.

== Resident diplomatic missions ==
- South Africa has an embassy in Kyiv.
- Ukraine has an embassy in Pretoria.

== See also ==
- Foreign relations of South Africa
- Foreign relations of Ukraine
