= Chancellor House (company) =

South African group of companies

- Type: Investment Holding Company
- Founded: March 2003
- Headquarters: 46B Wierda Road West, Wierda Valley, Sandton, Johannesburg, South Africa
- Area served: South Africa
- Key people: Khanyisile Kweyama (Chairperson); Mogopodi Mokoena (CEO)
- Website: https://www.chh.co.za/

Chancellor House is a South African holding company managing investments in the mining, engineering, energy and information technology sectors. It is named after Chancellor House, the building where the law firm of Nelson Mandela and Oliver Tambo was located.

After initially being exposed as a surreptitious funding front for the African National Congress (ANC) it was subsequently acknowledged as an in-house investment firm for the party. It is best known for the controversy surrounding the award to it of lucrative black economic empowerment and parastatal contracts.

== History ==
The existence of the company was first revealed to the public in 2006. A Mail & Guardian newspaper article alleged that the company had been formed in 2003 on the initiative of Mendi Msimang, then treasurer-general of the ANC, with the explicit intention of raising funds for the party.

Prior to the newspaper report the company was virtually unknown; Kgalema Motlanthe, then secretary general of the party, reportedly first learned of it when contacted by the newspaper for comment.

In September 2021, the company itself admitted that it served as a funding vehicle for the ANC.

On 10 November 2021, Mamatho Netsianda and Zwelibanzi Nzama, a senior executive, were implicated in a politically connected real estate development project dating back to 2008. Land above Sandton station had been transferred by the City of Johannesburg, but payment had never been received.

== Eskom contract ==
In November 2007 parastatal electricity supplier Eskom awarded for six steam generators worth R20 billion, to a consortium including Hitachi Power Africa. At the time of the award that company was 25% owned by Chancellor House.

In February 2008 the ANC said it would appoint advisers with a view to transparently exiting the transaction due to governance issues. In March 2008 the office of the Public Protector said an investigation into the transaction was underway.

Following charges under the Foreign Corrupt Practices Act by the Securities and Exchange Commission, Hitachi agreed to a $19 million settlement in September 2015. These perceptions of poor accountability, transparency and management associated with the ANC also attracted criticism from the Democratic Alliance, an opposition party.

== Russia ==
The ANC had received large donations from the Putin linked Russian oligarch Viktor Vekselberg, whilst the party's investment arm, Chancellor House, has a joint investment with Vekselberg in a South African manganese mine. This has been linked by the media to South Africa's allegedly friendly diplomatic stance to Russia during its invasion of Ukraine and the Lady R incident.
