= Russia–South Africa relations =

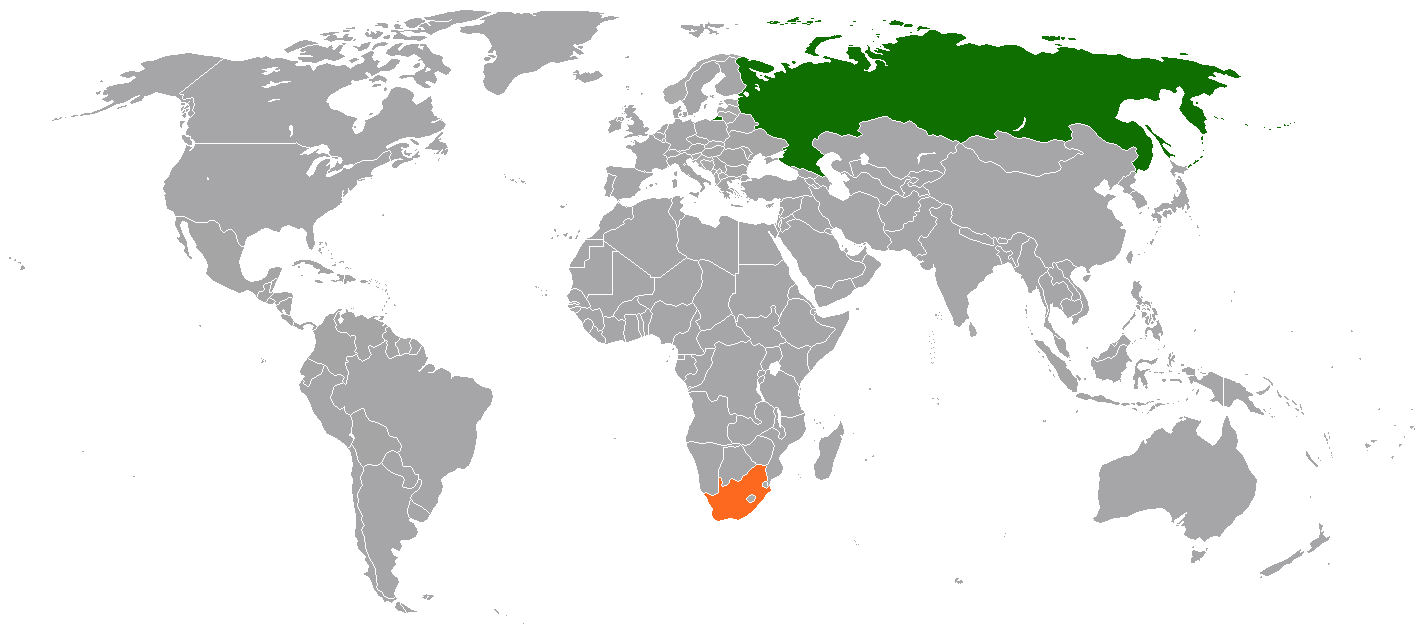
- Russia: South Africa

Envoy
- Ambassador I I Rogachev: Ambassador M J Maqetuka

Russia–South Africa relations (Russian: Российско-южноафриканские отношения) are foreign relations between Russia and South Africa. Russia has an embassy in Pretoria and a consulate-general in Cape Town. South Africa has an embassy in Moscow. Both countries are also members of BRICS.

== History ==
=== Early relations ===
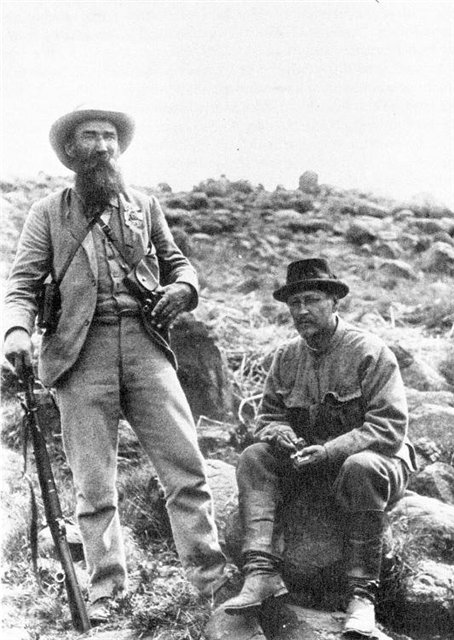
Russian soldier Lt. Col. Yevgeny Maximov (right) with Free State Gen. Kolbe (left) during the Second Boer War. A significant number of Russian nationals volunteered to fight on the Boer side.

In 1896, the Transvaal Republic established diplomatic relations with Russia. The Boer war was extensively covered by the Russian media and numerous books, articles, plays, pamphlets and poems were published about the war, usually with a pronounced pro-Boer slant. One Russian writer complained: "Wherever you go these days you hear the same story – the Boers, the Boers and only the Boers". The national anthem of the Transvaal Transvaal, Transvaal, My Country was frequently played by Russian orchestras, numerous committees were founded to collect money for the Transvaal, and church services offered up prayers for a British defeat. In countless newspaper serials and novels, the men of the kommandos were portrayed as heroes battling the arrogant British. Such was the popular enthusiasm that inns, restaurants, and cafés were given Afrikaans names and redecorated in the "Boer style" to improve business.

The British historian R.W. Johnson wrote: "Russian conservatives were pro-Boer not only for the usual nationalist, anti-British reasons but because they thought the Boers were like the best sort of Russians – conservative, rural, Christian folk resisting the invasion of their land by foreign (especially Jewish) capitalists." One Moscow newspaper in an editorial stated: "The deep historical meaning of this war is that faith, patriotism . . . the patriarchal family, primordial tribal unity, iron discipline and the complete lack of so-called modern civilisation have . . . become such an invincible force that even the seemingly invincible British have begun to tremble." However, though several hundred Russians did make their way to fight for the Transvaal, upon arriving they were often shocked by the corruption of the Transvaal government, its disorganized ways, and the casual brutality of the Afrikaners towards blacks.

=== Apartheid era ===
Soviet Union and South African Union established consular relations in 1942, but in 1956 South African Union severed them.

After South Africa became a republic in 1961, relations were very cold. South Africa considered the Soviet Union an enemy because it financially and militarily supported communism on the African continent. During the South African Border War, the Soviets supplied and trained SWAPO and MPLA fighters. However, by the late 1980s, Soviet interference in Africa minimized and relations between the two slightly warmed as the Cold War was ending.

Despite the widely reported Soviet support for the African National Congress and other liberation movements, the Soviet Union also engaged in some trade with South Africa during the apartheid era, mostly involving arms and some mineral resources. From 1960 to 1964, De Beers had a unique arrangement to market Soviet diamonds from Siberia. During the 1980s, a convoluted series of arms sales involving the Stasi, the Danish ship Pia Vesta, and Manuel Noriega of Panama ultimately aimed to transfer Soviet arms and military vehicles to South Africa. Around this time, the South African military's Armscor had a team of experts working in Leningrad involved in jet engine development.

=== Post-apartheid era ===
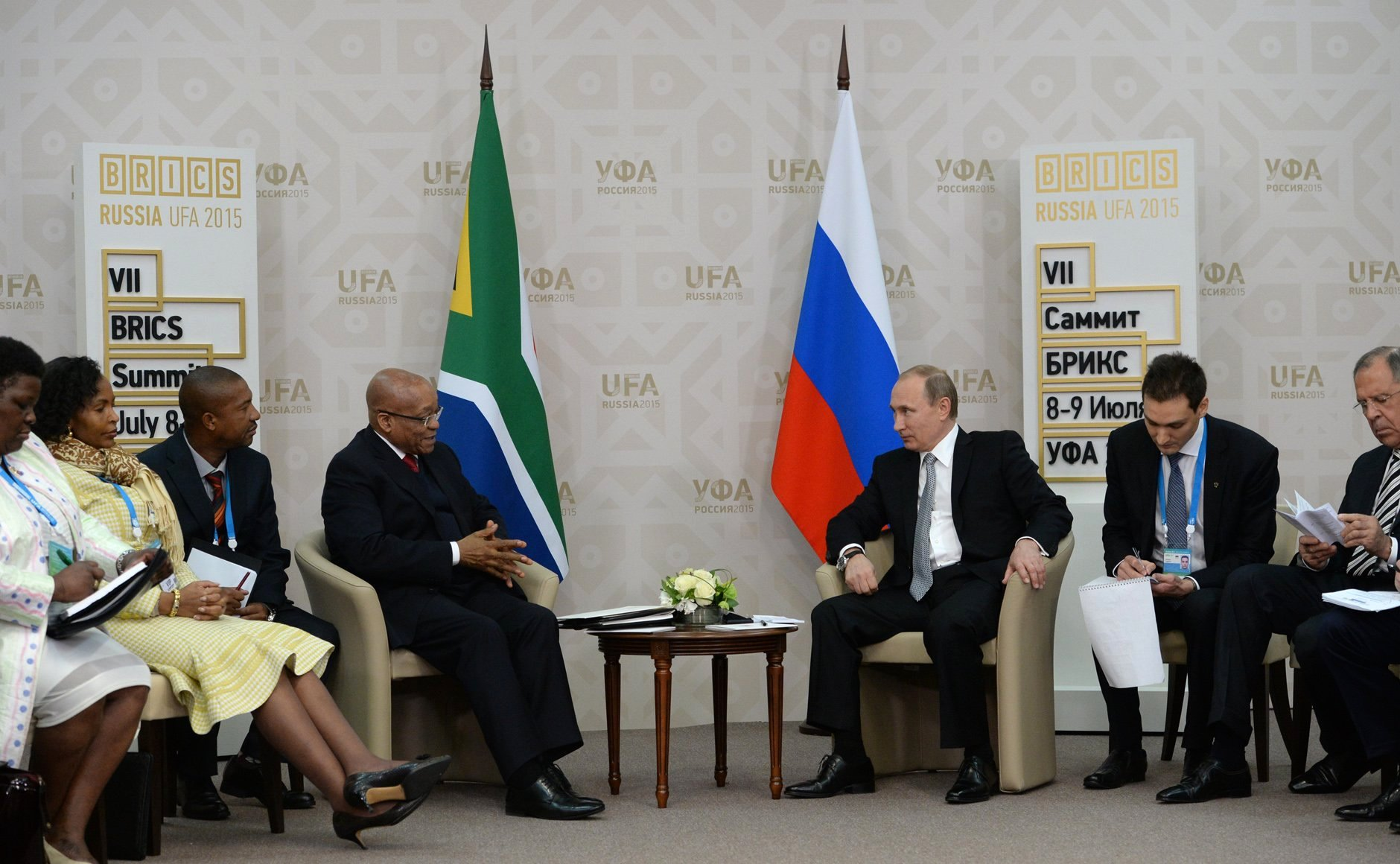
Russian President Vladimir Putin (right) meets with South African President Jacob Zuma (left) at the 2015 BRICS summit. Russian-South African relations significantly warmed during the Putin-Zuma administrations.

Directly after the collapse of the Soviet Union, South Africa recognized the Russian Federation in December 1991 and established diplomatic relations on February 28, 1992, becoming the first African nation to do so. In 1993 the two countries signed trade agreements which was followed by the signing of a military cooperation agreement in 1995. The April 1999 visit to Russia by President Nelson Mandela started a period of warming relations between the two countries.

Putin's 2006 visit to South Africa is noted as a particular turning point in the strengthening of bilateral relations. During the presidency of Jacob Zuma Russian-South Africa ties warmed significantly as the Putin administration sought to move a strategic country away from the West and gain a foothold in Africa; for its part South Africa sought to distance itself from Western actions in Libya during the fall of Muammar Gaddafi.

South Africa joined the BRICS group of nations in 2010, a key foreign policy goal of the Zuma administration, with the active support of the Russian Federation. This period also saw a period of closer ties with South Africa's security apparatus as members of South Africa's State Security Agency traveled to Russia for training and the country sought to build its own satellite surveillance capabilities with Russian assistance. During the Zuma administration bilateral agreements on agriculture, arts and culture, defence, education, energy, fisheries, mining, science and technology and transport were signed with Russia. Through his presidency Zuma made a number of medically related trips to Russia to receive treatment for alleged incidents of poisoning. University of Cape Town academic, Sean Gossel, has stated that bilateral relations between the two countries strengthened the most during the "State Capture years" between 2013 and 2017; thereby linking the growth of relations with the growth of corruption in South Africa.

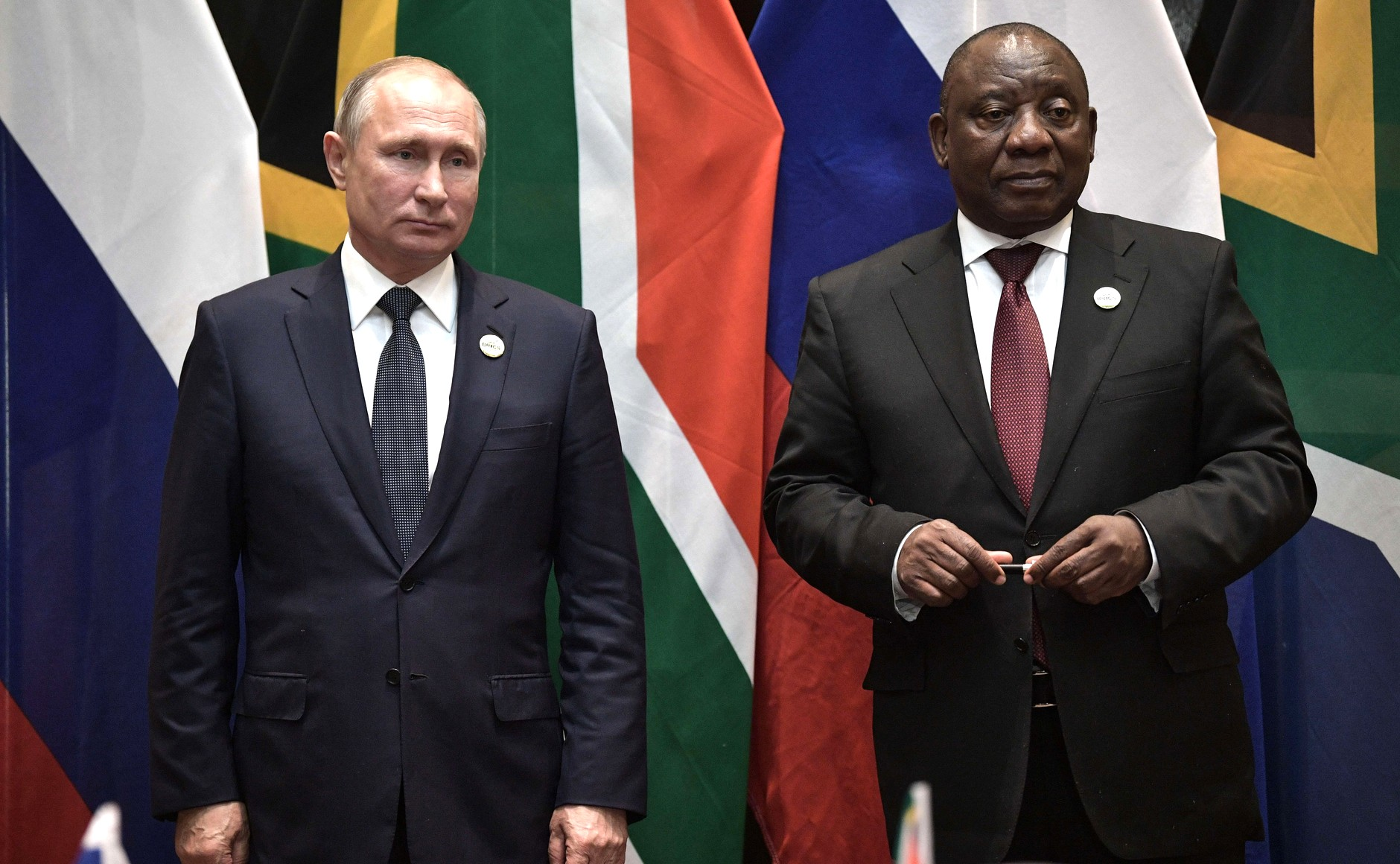
Russian-South African relations remained strong during the presidency of Cyril Ramaphosa despite Russia's 2022 invasion of Ukraine.

Despite a very slight cooling of relations during the administration of President Cyril Ramaphosa, support for Russia remains strong amongst the political left in South Africa, who support Russia's stance challenging the hegemony of the United States and what they see as a country that supports a global order based on international law and respect for the principle of non-interference in the internal affairs.

==== Nuclear deal ====
As part of an effort to resolve the South African energy crisis the Russian government offered to build and operate up to eight nuclear power plants at a cost of R1 trillion (US$66 billion). Both the Russian government and the administration of South African president Jacob Zuma put pressure on the South African government to force through the deal by attempting to circumvent South Africa's procurement laws. Then South African Finance Minister Nhlanhla Nene gave testimony to the Zondo Commission that he was fired for not approving a US$100 billion version of the deal in 2015. The deal was canceled by court order in April 2017.

==== Alleged Russian electoral interference ====
Prior to the conclusion of the 2019 South African general election allegations that Russia was conducting an influence operation to support the reelection of the ruling African National Congress (ANC). The Daily Maverick and Guardian newspapers reported that Putin associate Yevgeny Prigozhin worked to undermine support for the Democratic Alliance and Economic Freedom Fighters while increasing support for the ANC. The Daily Maverick and Dossier Center report stated that Russian political analysis worked "under the auspices of Africa and the International Anti-Crisis Center" to conduct an influence-buying and disinformation campaign. The Russian embassy in South Africa denied the accusation and stated that the accusation does "not stand [up to] basic scrutiny."

==== Russian invasion of Ukraine ====
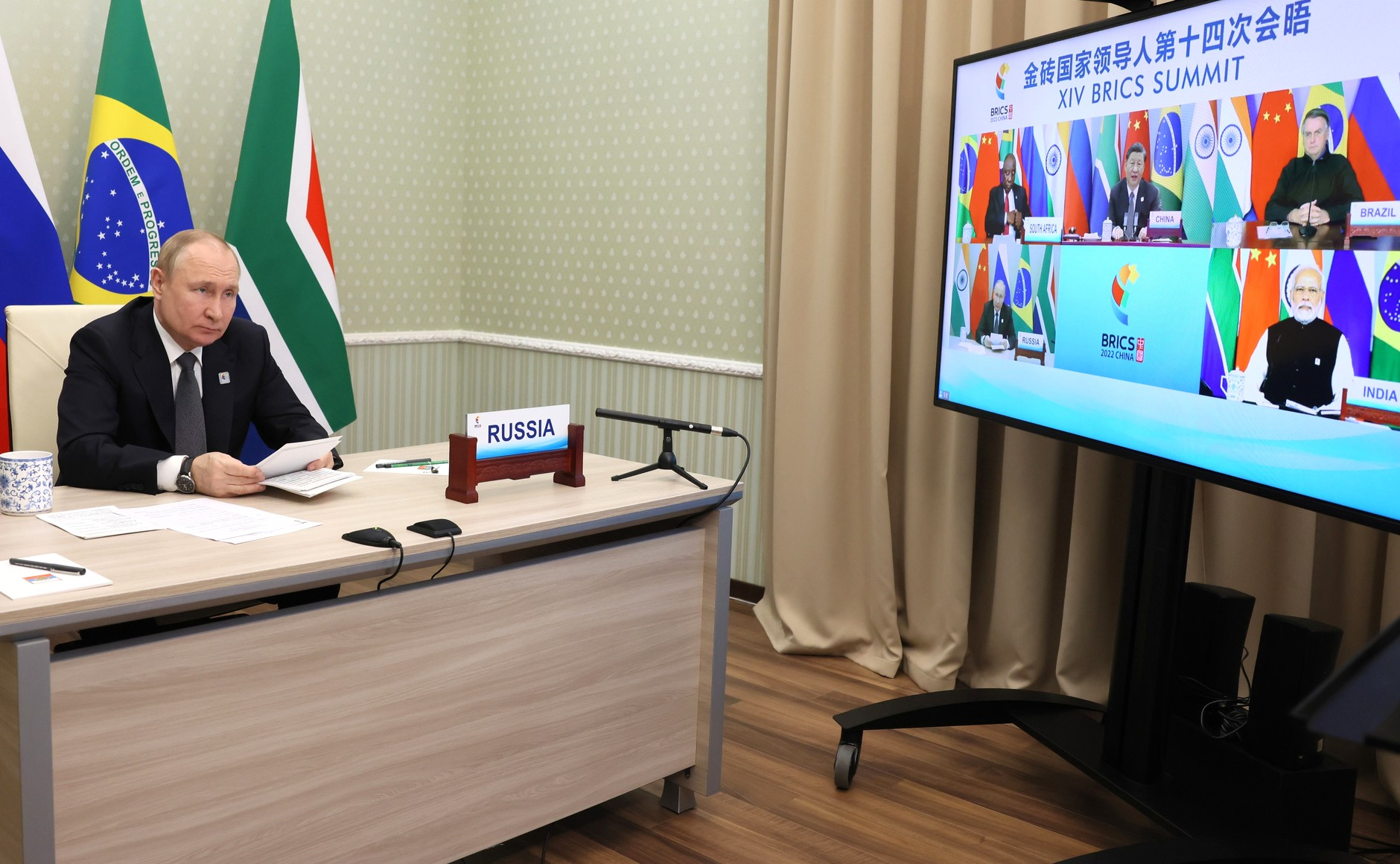
Russian President Vladimir Putin and South African President Cyril Ramaphosa at the virtual 14th BRICS summit on 23 June 2022

In response to the 2014 annexation of Crimea by the Russian Federation, the Zuma administration avoided criticizing Russia, arguing instead for BRICS members to unite in order to defend common interests of the group.

The South African government was initially critical of Russia's 2022 invasion of Ukraine calling on the country to "immediately withdraw its forces from Ukraine in line with the United Nations Charter." However these statements were soon withdrawn and in an effort to repair Russian-South African relations. President Ramaphosa reportedly disciplined International Relations and Cooperation Minister Naledi Pandor for making the statement on behalf of the government. Despite the invasion and resulting international diplomatic condemnation Russian-South Africa relations have reportedly remained strong, with South Africa being one of 35 countries to abstain from a subsequent United Nations vote demanding that Russia withdraw from Ukraine.

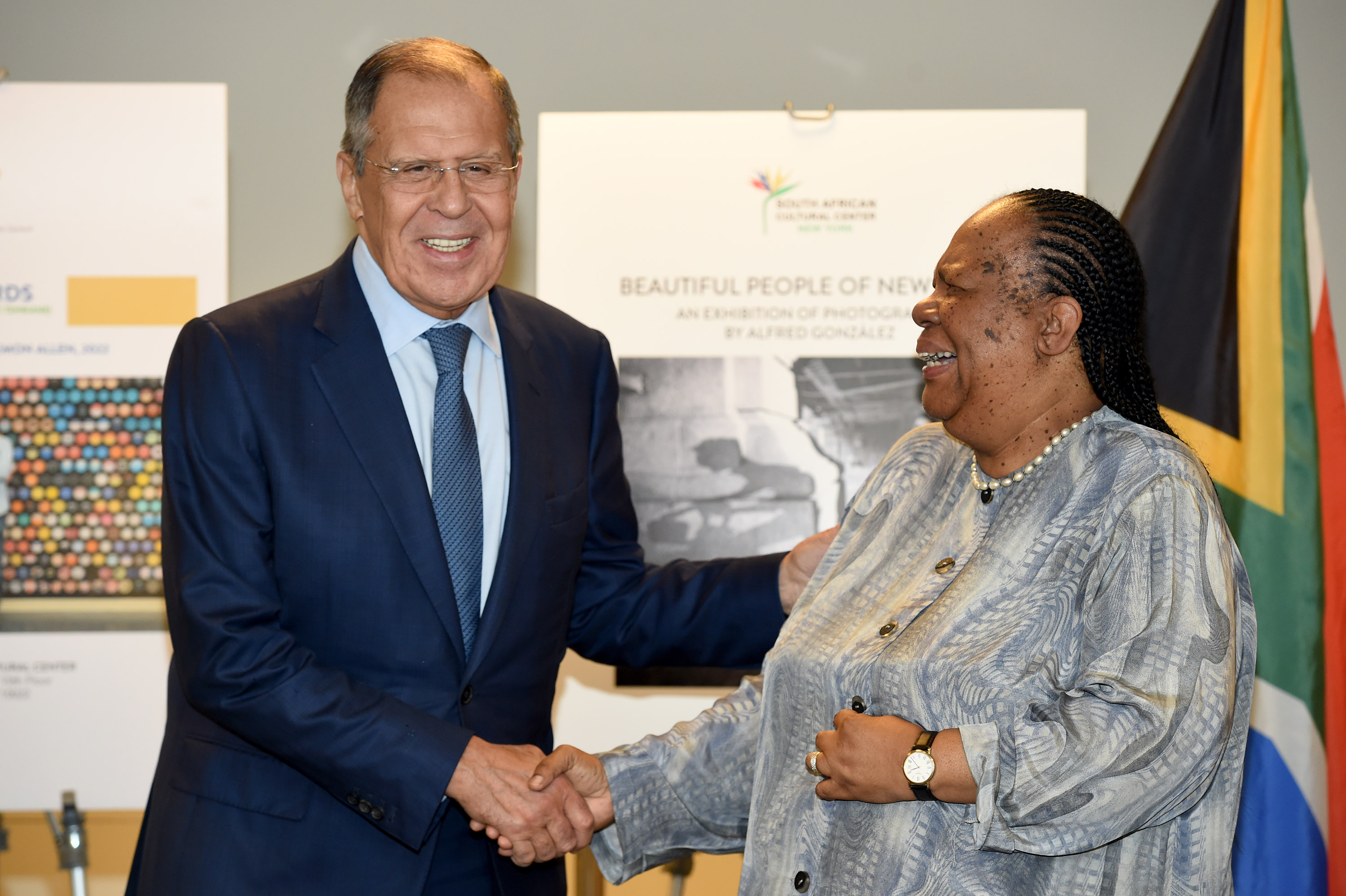
Russian Foreign Minister Sergey Lavrov and South African Foreign Minister Naledi Pandor in New York City on 22 September 2022

In response to public criticism by the South African media of the South African government's non-critical position towards Russia minister Pandor has postulated that the local media might be "part of orchestrated propaganda campaign" by presenting a "narrative which has tended to support the actions of the big powers." During the war Russian Defence Minister Sergei Shoigu described South Africa as a "friendly state" and that South Africa's support has helped counter NATO pressure on Russia. South Africa's Defense Minister Thandi Modise visited Moscow in August 2022.

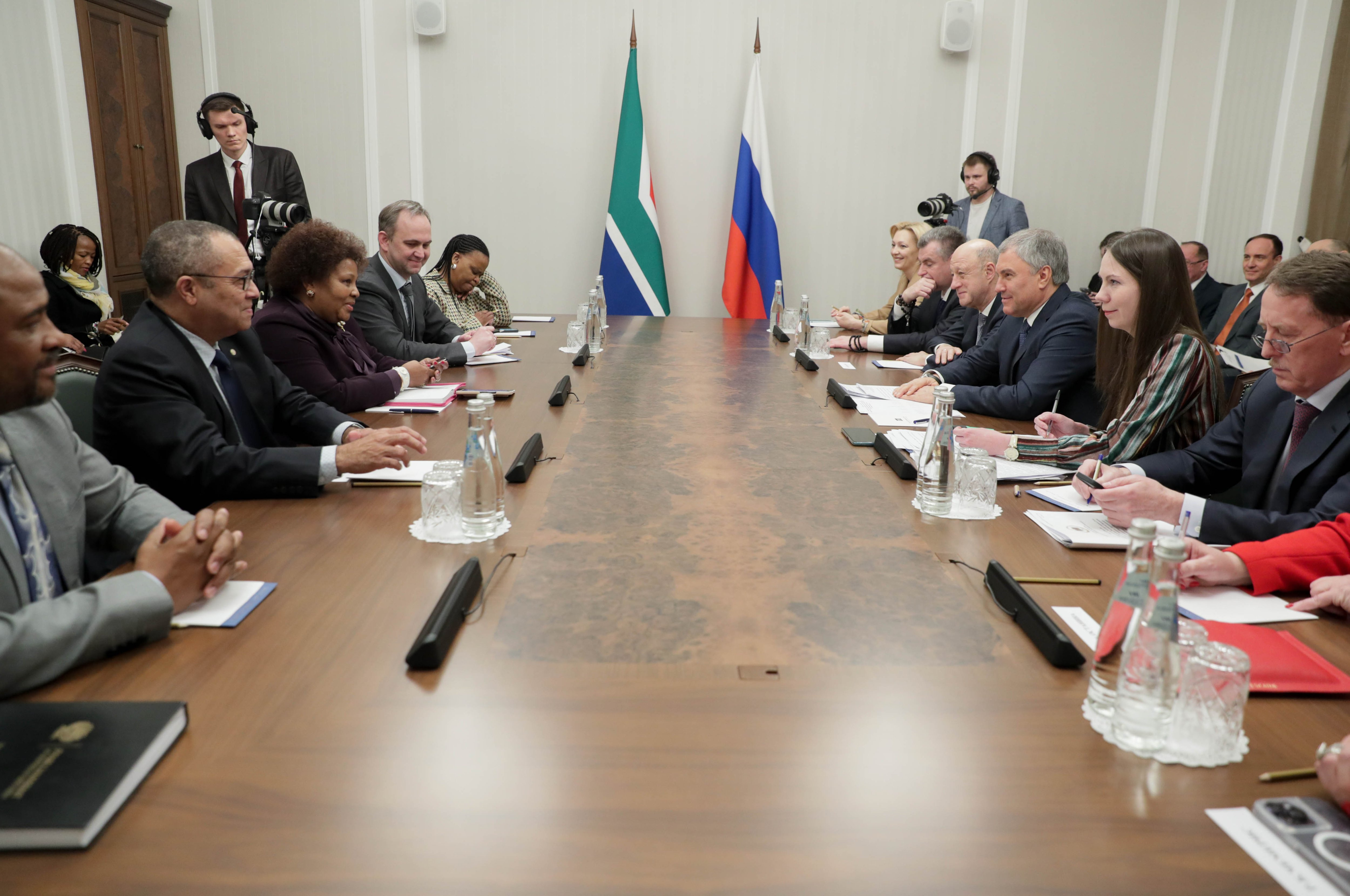
Nosiviwe Mapisa-Nqakula and Vyacheslav Volodin at the “Russia-Africa” parliamentary conference in Moscow on 17 March 2023

Reacting to the ICC arrest warrant for Vladimir Putin, South African Foreign Minister Naledi Pandor criticized the International Criminal Court (ICC) for not having what she called an "evenhanded approach" to all leaders responsible for violations of international law. South Africa, which failed in its obligation to arrest visiting Sudanese President Omar al-Bashir in June 2015, invited Russian President Vladimir Putin to the 15th BRICS Summit in South Africa in August 2023. As South Africa is a signatory to the Rome Statute, the presence of Vladimir Putin remains uncertain. In May 2023, South Africa announced that they would be giving diplomatic immunity to Vladimir Putin, his officials and other Russians while attending the 15th BRICS Summit. It is widely assumed this was an attempt to circumvent the ICC arrest warrant, despite the government's claim that such immunity was routinely granted ahead of international inter-governmental events of this magnitude. In July 2023, Vladimir Putin announced that he would not attend the summit of the BRICS group of emerging economies in South Africa in August and that Russia would instead be represented by its Foreign Minister Sergei Lavrov.

Western Cape Premier Alan Winde criticized the ruling African National Congress (ANC) government for inviting Putin to South Africa and said that he would instruct the provincial Law Enforcement Advancement Plan (LEAP) officers to arrest Putin "if he sets foot in the Western Cape". South African minister Khumbudzo Ntshavheni disputed Winde's words, saying that "If President Putin is in the country and he is protected by the presidential protection service, I don't know how Premier Winde, who does not have even policing functions, will get through the presidential protection service."

On 23–26 January 2023, Russian Foreign Minister Sergey Lavrov visited South Africa and several other African states. Pandor thanked Lavrov for the "most wonderful meeting" and described Russia as a "valued partner."

In the early morning of December 6, 2022, a sanctioned Russian cargo ship named Lady R, which had turned off its marine tracking system, made an unexpected and controversial port call at the Naval Base in Simon's Town. The ship was loaded and unloaded with cargo under armed guard during nighttime and departed three days later. The docking was shrouded in secrecy, and neither the South African nor Russian government commented on it, as noted by the media. Six months later South Africa allowed the secretive landing of a US-sanctioned Russian cargo aircraft to land at the Waterkloof Air Force Base. These actions further strained South Africa's relationship with Western countries whilst increasing skepticism of South Africa's self-proclaimed non-aligned or neutral position on the war in Ukraine.

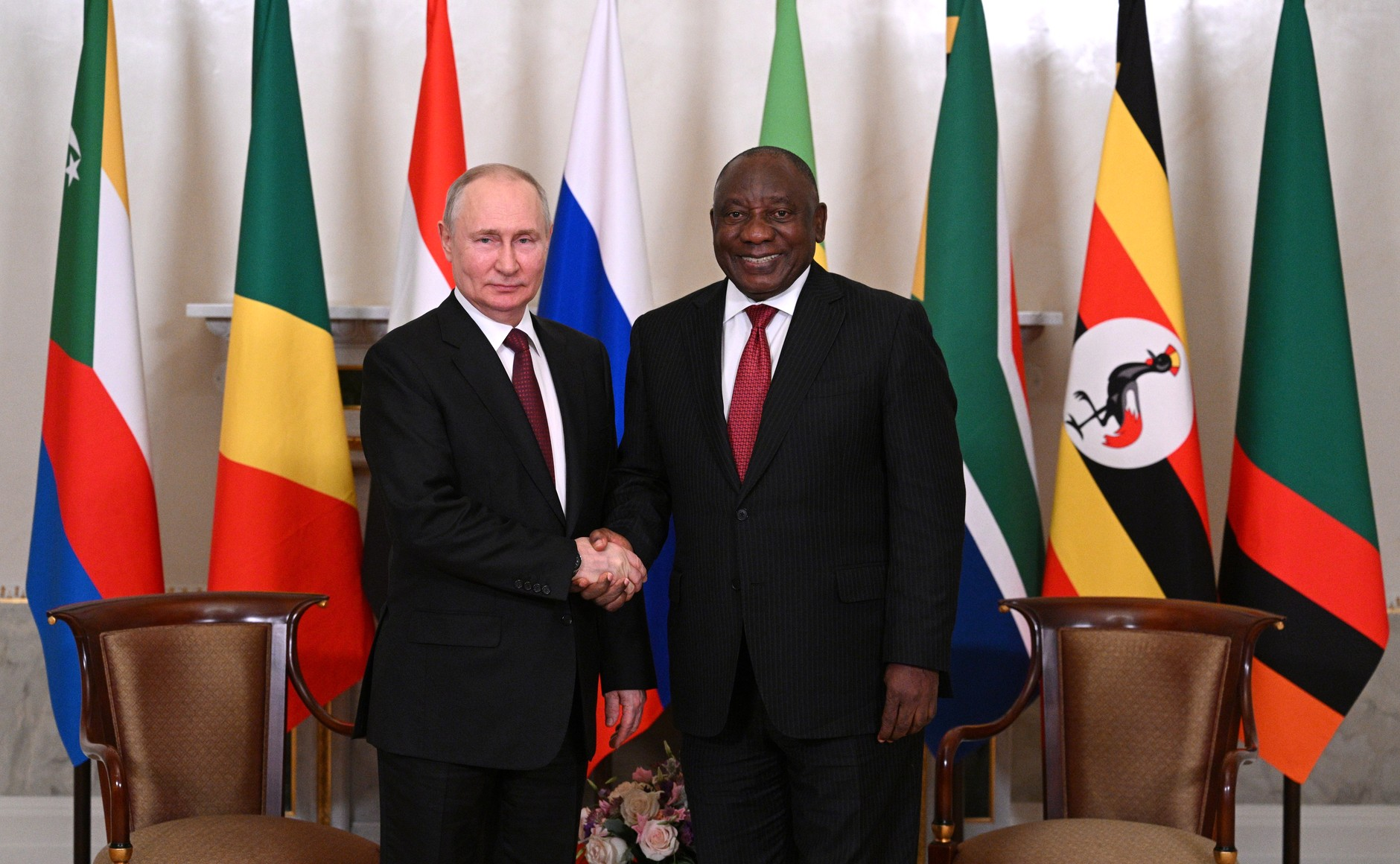
Cyril Ramaphosa with Vladimir Putin in St. Petersburg on 17 June 2023

In May 2023 the American ambassador to South Africa, Reuben Brigety, accused South Africa of supplying arms to Russia during the December 2022 docking of the Lady R. South Africa denied the allegation and claimed Bridgety later apologized for the statement, Russia responded by stating that their government “expressed their intention to further intensify mutually beneficial relations” in a possible attempt to exploit the situation.

On 16 May 2023, Ramaphosa announced that the leaders of African countries came up with a new initiative for peace in Ukraine. In June 2023, Ramaphosa led a delegation to Russia and Ukraine, which also included heads of state from Zambia, the Republic of Congo, Egypt and Senegal. Both Russia and Ukraine welcomed the African leaders’ mission, but Ukrainian Foreign Minister Dmytro Kuleba warned that "Any peace initiative should respect the territorial integrity of Ukraine, it should not imply, even in-between the lines, any cessation of Ukrainian territory to Russia. Second, any peace plan should not lead to the freezing of the conflict."

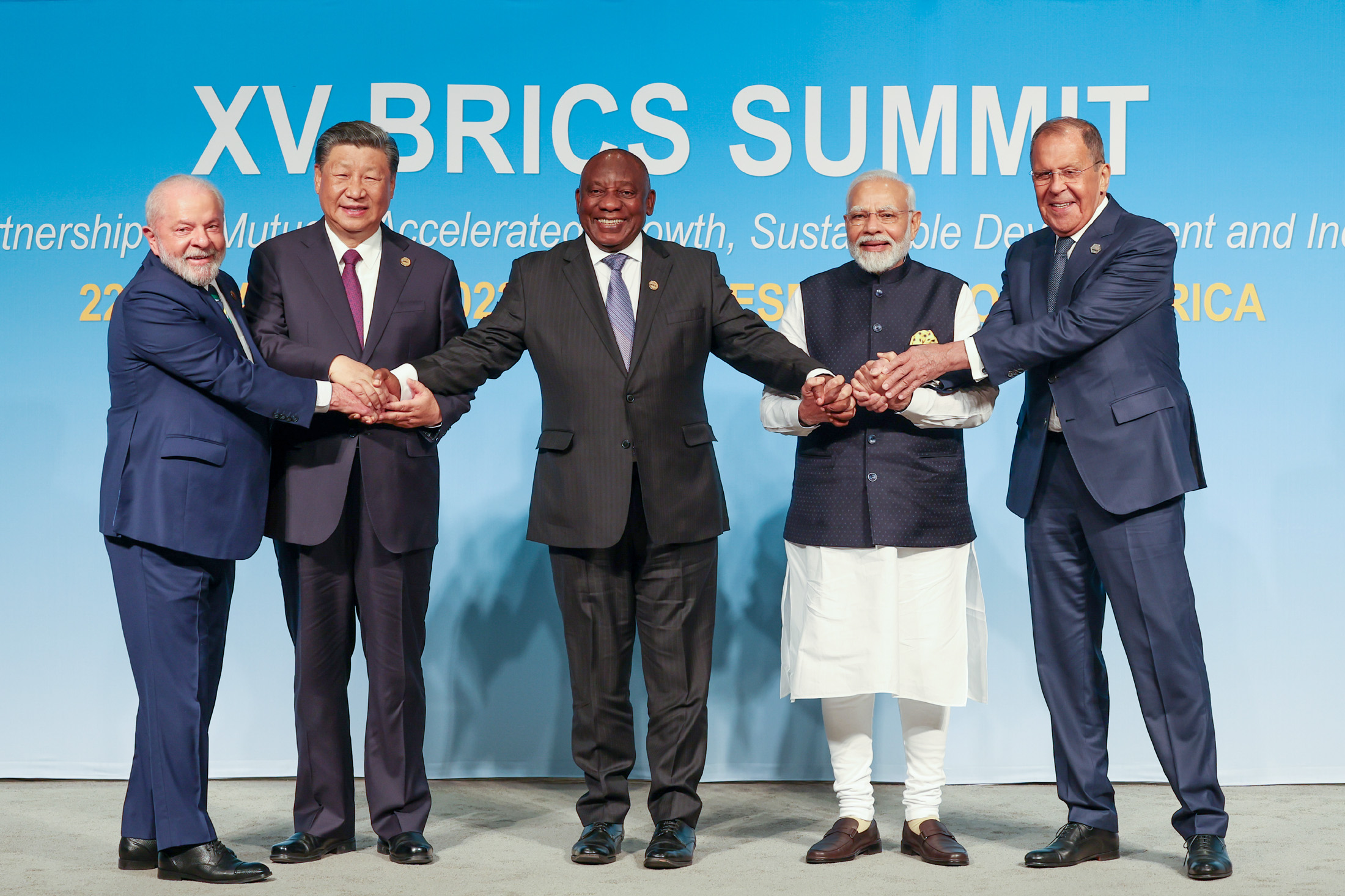
Ramaphosa and other BRICS leaders during the 15th BRICS Summit in Johannesburg, August 2023. Russia was represented by Foreign Minister Lavrov.

On 17 June 2023, Ramaphosa met with Vladimir Putin in St. Petersburg. He told Putin that the war must end, but Putin rejected the delegation's peace plan based on accepting Ukraine's internationally recognized borders. In July 2023, Ramaphosa attended the 2023 Russia–Africa Summit in St. Petersburg.

Prominent South Africans have been implicated in illegal recruitment schemes that lured citizens to fight for Russia in Ukraine under false pretenses. High-profile cases involve Jacob Zuma’s daughter, Duduzile Zuma-Sambudla, and SAFM presenter Nonkululeko Mantula.

==== African National Congress support for Russia ====
South Africa's ruling political party since 1994, the ANC, has notably not condemned the Russian invasion of Ukraine. A position which the ANC has received criticism for from opposition parties, public commentators, academics, civil society organisations, and former ANC members. The ANC Youth League has meanwhile condemned sanctions against Russia and denounced NATO's eastward expansion as "fascistic". Officials representing the ANC Youth League acted as international observers for Russia's staged referendum to annex Ukrainian territory conquered during the war. In February 2024 ANC Secretary-General Fikile Mbalula attended a "forum on combating Western neocolonialism" hosted by Russia, thereby drawing further criticism for the party's perceived support for Russia's invasion.

The ANC has received large donations from the Putin-linked Russian oligarch Viktor Vekselberg, whilst the party's investment arm, Chancellor House, has a joint investment with Vekselberg in a South African manganese mine.

== Economic ties ==
South African exports to Russia are dominated by food products and capital equipment.

As of 2022 South African companies have invested R77 billion (US$5.13 billion) in Russia. This includes investments by major South African companies such as Naspers (owner of Mail.ru), AB Inbev (formally SABMiller) and Barloworld. South Africa has invested a further R25 billion in the BRICS bank thereby further tying the country to Russia. Russia's investments in South Africa in the same period amounted to R23 billion (US$1.5 billion).

== See also ==
- Foreign relations of Russia
- Foreign relations of South Africa
- 2019 Russia–Africa Summit
- List of ambassadors of Russia to South Africa
