= Renova Group =

Russian conglomerate

- Company type: Limited liability company
- Industry: Investments; Conglomerate
- Founded: 1990; 36 years ago
- Founder: Viktor Vekselberg
- Headquarters: Moscow, Russia, Russia
- Key people: Viktor Vekselberg (Chairman)
- Number of employees: 134,000

Renova Group is a Russian conglomerate with interests in aluminium, oil, energy, telecoms and a variety of other sectors. The main owner and president is Viktor Vekselberg who founded the company in 1990.

The Renova Group is primarily active in Russia, the C.I.S. states, Switzerland, South Africa and the United States. Its major assets include participation in the oil company TNK-BP and in aluminum producer RUSAL.

Renova maintains very close ties to both Saudi Arabia and the Arab world as a member of the Russian-Saudi Economic Council and the Russian-Saudi and Russian-Arab Business Councils which are part of the Chamber of Commerce and Industry (CCI). Vladimir Yevtushenkov, who founded and controls Sistema, is the chairman of both the Russian-Saudi and Russian-Arab Business Councils since 2002.

In 2010 Renova Group entered into an agreement to provide funding for Fort Ross. It is parent company of private equity firm Columbus Nova.

== United States sanctions ==
In April 2018, the United States Treasury announced that it would impose sanctions on several Russian oligarchs, including Viktor Vekselberg and Renova Group. The sanctions were due to alleged tampering in the 2016 United States presidential election by Russian entities (including Vekselberg), and other unspecified activities.
