= Viktor Vekselberg =

Russian–Cypriot oligarch and businessman (born 1957)

- Виктор Вексельберг
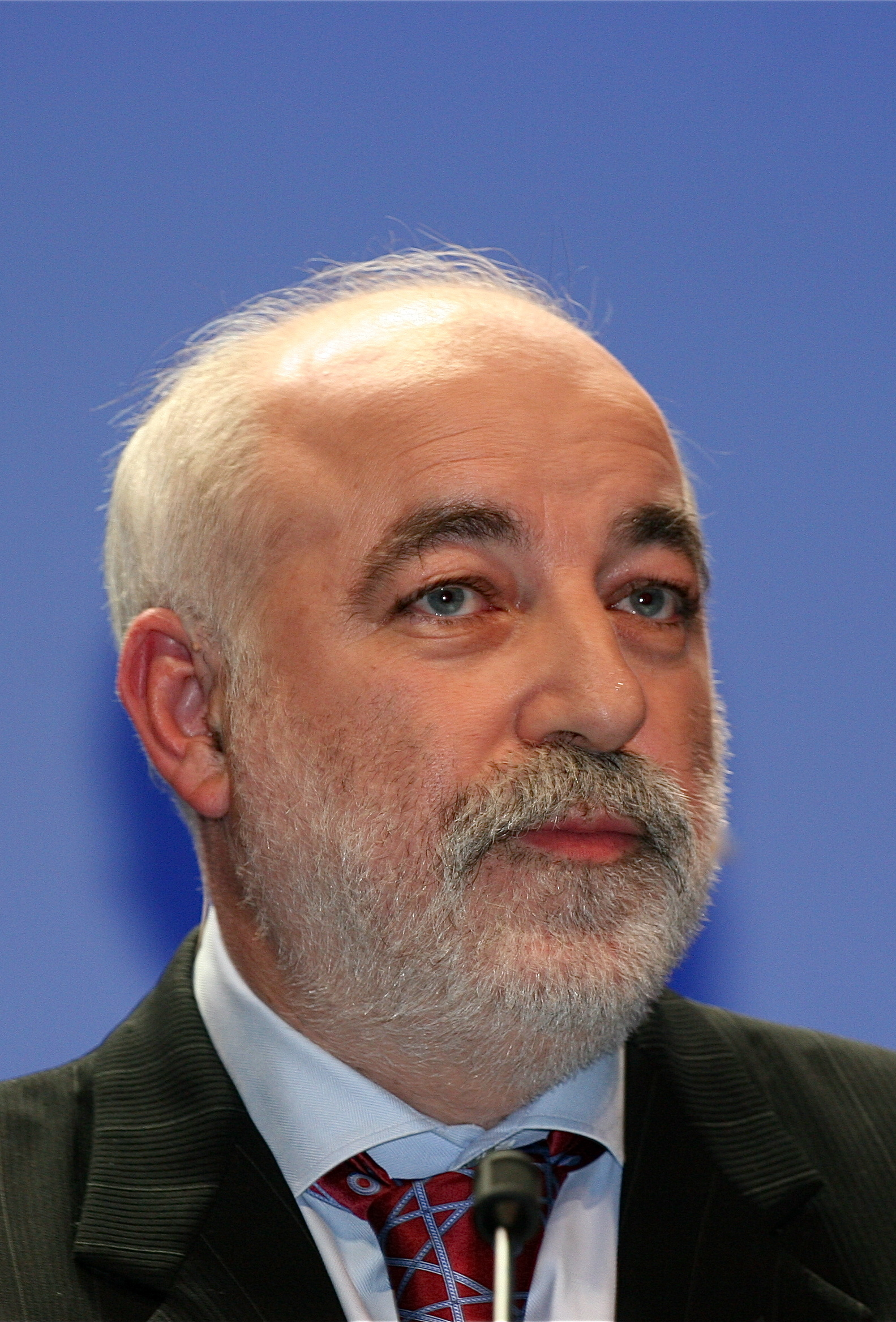
- Vekselberg in 2008
- Born: April 14, 1957 (age 69); Drohobych, Ukrainian SSR, Soviet Union (now Ukraine)
- Citizenship: Israel; Russia; Cyprus
- Education: Moscow Transportation Engineering Institute
- Occupation: Businessman
- Known for: Founder of Renova Group
- Title: Chairman of Renova Group
- Spouse: Married
- Children: 2
- Awards: Order "For Merit to the Fatherland" (4th class); Order of Alexander Nevsky; Decoration "For Beneficence"
- Website: vekselberg.org

Viktor Felixovich Vekselberg (Note: Russian: Виктор Феликсович Вексельберг Ukrainian: Віктор Феліксович Вексельберг) (born April 14, 1957) is a Russian-Israeli businessman and oligarch. He is the founder and chairman of Renova Group, a Russian conglomerate. According to Forbes, as of November 2021, his fortune is estimated at $9.3 billion, making him the 262nd richest person in the world. Born in Ukraine, he has Russian, Israeli and Cypriot citizenship.

== Early life, family and education ==
Viktor Vekselberg was born in 1957 to a Ukrainian Jewish father and a Russian mother in Drohobych, Ukrainian Soviet Socialist Republic (although some reports state that he was born in Lviv). Members of Vekselberg's family were killed and buried in a mass grave during the Nazi repressions in Drohobych. Vekselberg's father fought for the Soviet Union during World War II. Andrew Intrater is Vekselberg's cousin.

In 1979, he graduated from the Moscow State University of Railway Engineering. After that, he worked as a researcher and headed the laboratory of the Design Bureau for rodless pumps "Konnas".

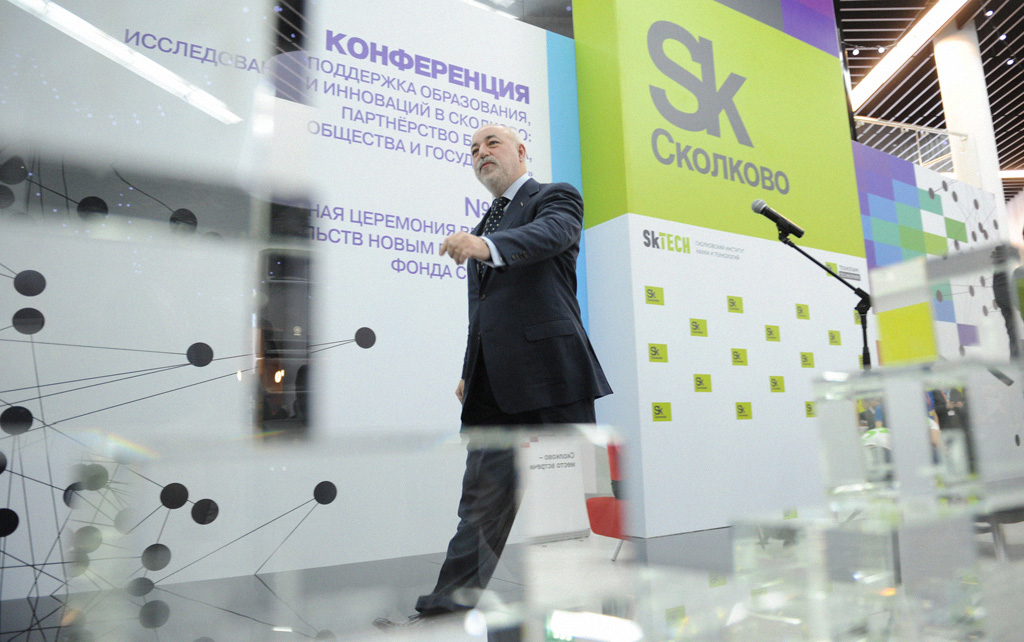
Giving a presentation at the Skolkovo Institute of Science and Technology

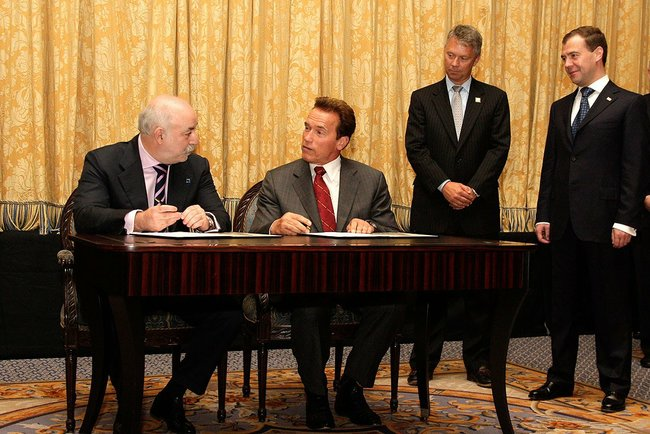
Russian President Dmitry Medvedev witnessed the signing of a memorandum on cooperation between Governor of California Arnold Schwarzenegger and Viktor Vekselberg, June 23, 2010

== Activities ==
=== Russian activities ===
In 1988, after the Gorbachev administration relaxed restrictions on private business as part of its new policies of Perestroika and Glasnost, Vekselberg founded company Komvek, and in 1990, he co-founded Renova Group with college classmates, Leonard Blavatnik and Vladimir Balaeskoul (later, they both sold their stakes in Renova to Vekselberg). In the mid-1990s, Vekselberg and Blavatnik embarked on accumulating interests in aluminium smelters. The two partners recommissioned production at Irkutsk Aluminium Plant which had been previously suspended. In 1996, they co-founded Siberian-Urals Aluminium Company (SUAL) by merging of Ural and Irkutsk Aluminium Plants into Russia's first aluminium holding company. (SUAL would later merge with Russian Aluminium of Oleg Deripaska and alumina assets of Glencore to create United Company RUSAL, the world's largest aluminium company). In 2002, SUAL constructed the first private railway in Russia to connect a bauxite mine in the Komi Republic with Ural Aluminium Plant through Trans-Siberian Railroad.

SUAL was the first major Russian company to pursue a consistent social policy in regions, offering support to local communities and small entrepreneurs. As from 2001, SUAL initiated several social and economic partnerships between its aluminium smelters and local municipalities in the regions of their presence. Moreover, SUAL set up a lifetime pension plan for World War II veterans who used to work at the plants that became part of SUAL.

In 1997, Alfa Group (owned by Mikhail Fridman, German Khan, and Alexei Kuzmichev) created with Vekselberg and Blavatnik a partnership for the acquisition of an interest in Tyumen Oil Company (TNK) that later became one of Russia's largest oil and gas companies. In order to jointly hold oil assets, Alfa Group, Access Industries (a company owned by Blavatnik) and Vekselberg's Renova established AAR consortium.

In 2003, AAR and British Petroleum (a British-American company then) merged their Russian oil assets in a 50-50 joint venture named TNK-BP, and that was the largest private transaction in Russian history. Acting as the chairman of the executive board of TNK, Vekselberg was instrumental in negotiating and closing the transaction. Vekselberg's indirect participation in TNK-BP amounted to 12.5%.

In the 2000s, TNK-BP was the third oil & gas company in Russia. Among other things, TNK-BP considered construction of a gas pipeline from the Kovykta gas condensate field through Mongolia to China and South Korea. Also, the original plan also envisaged the possibility to build up a large helium production facility on the basis of Sayanskkhimplast plant to export helium to Asia-Pacific markets. In the middle of 2012, BP started talks with the state oil company Rosneft with a view to selling BP's 50% stake in TNK-BP. Rosneft finalised preliminary approval of a comprehensive deal in early 2013, offering to buy out TNK-BP in its entirety - AAR received cash consideration for its stake, BP received cash and Rosneft shares.

In 2006, Renova Group decided to diversify its business and divest from the oil and gas sector to expand its footprint in manufacturing, hi-tech, and renewable energy. In 2007, Standard & Poor's assigned a 'BB' long-term corporate credit rating to Renova Holding Ltd. and that spoke for the Group's significant progress in portfolio diversification and liquidity improvement. After divesting from the oil & gas sector, Vekselberg focused on the renewable energy, transport infrastructure, manufacturing, and IoT. Vekselberg became a pioneer in the Russian solar power sector. In 2017, Vekselberg inaugurated Platov International Airport in Rostov-on-Don, the first greenfield airport built in Russia after the collapse of the USSR. Platov airport was closed following Russian invasion against Ukraine. Eurocontrol predicts that the suspension of airports in the South of Russia will last until 2029. In 2019, Gagarin International Airport, the second greenfield airport, was put in operation in Saratov.

The Skolkovo Foundation was established in 2010 as a non-profit organization to encourage Russian innovation and openness of the Russian economy. The Board of the Skolkovo Foundation was led by two elected co-chairs, namely Viktor Vekselberg and ex-Chair of Intel Craig Barrett. As its president, Vekselberg signed a deal for Cisco Systems to invest $1 billion over ten years into Skolkovo Foundation projects. In 2018, Vekselberg stepped down as chairman of Skolkovo Foundation. Lucia Ziobro, assistant special agent in charge of the FBI's Boston office published in a column of trade journal that the Skolkovo Foundation may being used by the Russian government to gain access to classified American technology.

=== International activities ===
In 2004, Renova Group opened a branch in Zurich, Renova Management AG, as a part of the strategic plan to diversify its business towards hi-tech.

In July 2006, Renova Group acquired 10.25% in Unaxis Holding AG (later renamed as OC Oerlikon) from Victory Industriebeteiligung AG, an Austrian conglomerate.

In April 2007, Everest Beteiligungs GmbH, a joint venture of Renova Group and Victory, acquired approximately 18% in shares and additional 14% in physical delivery options in Sulzer.

Later, in 2007 – 2008, Victory sold out their stakes in both companies. In 2009, Renova Group raised its stake in Oerlikon to 44.7%.

This accumulation of stakes in the two flagships of the Swiss economy by the foreign conglomerate raised concerns with the Swiss authorities. Nevertheless, in 2010 the Federal Criminal Court confirmed that neither Vekselberg, nor Victory done any wrongdoing while building stakes in Oerlikon. Later, the Federal Department of Finance dropped the criminal proceedings initiated against the three investors in Sulzer in 2009.

The world financial crisis 2008 fully impacted Oerlikon company in November 2009 when it became apparent that the group would not have enough liquidity to repay loans. The company arranged a bank waiver to negotiate with all lenders and shareholders for a long-term solution and at AGM in April 2010 Renova Group agreed to inject capital in Oerlikon as part of the restructuring plan. Michael Süss, Oetlikon CEO, recently noted it has saved the company, this view is supported by the local expert community.

Because of a strong decline in European metal consumption and a significant decrease in metal prices in the local market Schmolz+Bickenbach (renamed in 2020 as Swiss Steel) meat the covenant breach in November 2012. Next year Renova Group had to be initiated a capital increase in the company for it can continue to develop in the long term and on a solid financial basis.

In March 2017, he was offered citizenship of the Republic of Cyprus due to his investments in the country; however, a spokesperson for Vekselberg reiterated that he only had Russian citizenship.

== Sanctions ==
Vekselberg is one of many Russian "oligarchs" named in the Countering America's Adversaries Through Sanctions Act (CAATSA) signed into law by President Donald Trump in 2017.

In March 2018, members from Robert Mueller's team of special counsel investigators questioned Vekselberg at a New York area airport.

According to journalist Stephen Smith, Vekselberg is close to the Kremlin.

In April 2018, the United States Department of the Treasury imposed sanctions on Vekselberg and Renova Group through designation under Executive Order 13662 ("Blocking Property of Additional Persons Contributing to the Situation in Ukraine"). United States imposed sanctions on him and 23 other Russian nationals in relation to Russia's annexation of Crimea, officially freezing up to $2 billion in assets. Also he has been sanctioned by The U.S. Department of the Treasury's Office of Foreign Assets Control (OFAC) "for operating in the energy sector of the Russian Federation economy".

In February 2021, Vekselberg complained that approximately $1.5 billion of his funds were frozen in American and Swiss bank accounts and that he was not allowed to send at least part of them to charity. Between 2018 and 2020 a US business PURE Insurance assisted Vekselberg with $315,891 of transactions in breach of sanctions and was accordingly fined $466,200 by OFAC in 2023.

On September 1, 2022, several properties believed to be linked to Vekselberg were searched by the FBI and Department of Homeland Security. The inspection included an apartment in Manhattan; an estate in the Hamptons, New York; and property on Fisher Island in Florida. Officials were seen carrying boxes out of the two New York locations.

In March 2022, following Russia's invasion against Ukraine, the United States strengthened its sanctions and the UK, Poland and Australia also placed sanctions on Vekselberg, thereby seizing his assets and imposing a travel ban. During the Lady R incident Vekselberg was noted in the media as a possible source of Russian foreign influence over the South Africa's governing party, the African National Congress (ANC), through his 49% ownership stake in United Manganese of Kalahari which is a joint venture with the ANC owned Chancellor House. United Manganese of Kalahari made a US$1.3 million donation to the party in 2022.

=== Seizure of the Motoryacht Tango ===
United States Attorney General Merrick Garland announces the seizure of the Motoryacht Tango, April 4, 2022

Following the Russian invasion of Ukraine, United States President Joe Biden signed Executive Order 14068, "Prohibiting Certain Imports, Exports, and New Investment With Respect to Continued Russian Federation Aggression," an order of economic sanctions under the United States International Emergency Economic Powers Act. The order targeted two properties of Vekselberg worth an estimated $180 million: an Airbus A319-115 jet and the motoryacht Tango. Estimates of the value of the Tango range from $90 million (U.S. Department of Justice estimate) to $120 million (from the website Superyachtfan.com).

In April 2022, the yacht was seized by Civil Guard of Spain and U.S. federal agents in Mallorca. A United States Department of Justice press release states that the seizure of the Tango was by request of Task Force KleptoCapture, an interagency task force operated through the United States Deputy Attorney General.

The matter is pending in the United States District Court for the District of Columbia. The affidavit for the seizure warrant states that the yacht is seized on probable cause to suspect violations of 18 U.S.C. § 1349 (conspiracy to commit bank fraud), 50 U.S.C. § 1705 (International Emergency Economic Powers Act), and 18 U.S.C. § 1956 (money laundering), and as authorized by American statutes on civil and criminal asset forfeiture.

== Philanthropy ==
=== Jewish philanthropy and remembrance of Holocaust ===
Vekselberg is a Russian Jewish Congress Consul for Countering Antisemitism, a member of the Bureau of the Presidium of the Congress. Vekselberg has provided support to local Jewish communities throughout Russia and Ukraine in the course of the past decades. With his support, Synagogues and Jewish Community centers have been restored, built and renovated in Ekaterinburg, Irkutsk, Novosibirsk, Moscow, and Saratov.

Since the 1990s, Vekselberg has funded the maintaining of the Bronnitsky Wood Memorial near Drohobych to honor the memory of Jews murdered by Nazis during World War II.

He donated $4.5 million to the construction of the $50 million Jewish Museum and Tolerance Center in Moscow, and until February 2021 he was the chairman of the museum's board of trustees. Then Vekselberg was elected as honorary chairman of the board of trustees.

He finances the restoration and construction of synagogues in Russia, including the construction of the Choral Synagogue in Saratov.

In June 2018, a synagoge in Drogobych, Vekselberg's native town in Western Ukraine, was restored from ruins and reopened its doors to public. Vekselberg financed the restoration works and managed to track down the Torah scroll which had been taken out from Drohobych during the Holocaust and later to be hidden in Israel in 1946. He donated this scroll to the synagogue in the loving memory of his father, Felix Solomonovich Vekselberg.

In 2019, a monument was opened in Moscow to commemorate resistance heroes in concentration camps and ghettos. Vekselberg donated $300,000 to its creation.

In 2020, when the coronavirus pandemic broke out, Viktor Vekselberg donated over 2 billion rubles to buy medical equipment, personal protective equipment, and food for socially vulnerable groups of citizens.

In 2021, Russian Foreign Minister Sergey Lavrov awarded Viktor Vekselberg, among other leaders of the Russian Union of Industrialists and Entrepreneurs, for helping to bring back Russian tourists from abroad.

=== Fabergé Museum ===
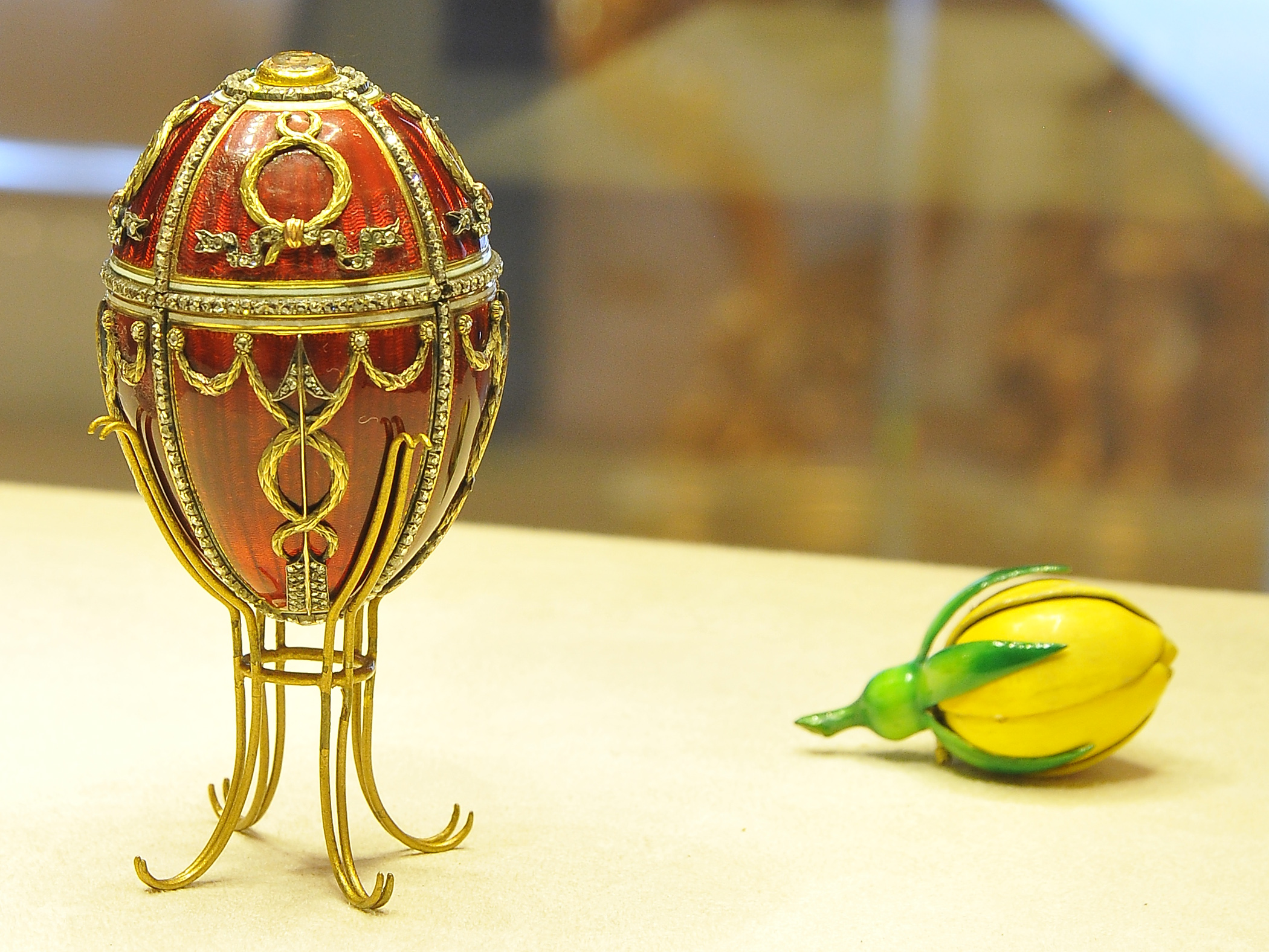
The Rosebud egg is part of the Victor Vekselberg Collection, housed in the Fabergé Museum in Saint Petersburg, Russia.

In February 2004, Vekselberg purchased nine Fabergé Imperial Easter eggs from the Forbes publishing family in New York City. The collection was transported to Russia and exhibited in the Kremlin and in Dubrovnik in 2007. Vekselberg is the single largest owner of Fabergé eggs in the world, owning fifteen of them (nine Imperial, two Kelch, and four other Fabergé eggs). In a 2013 BBC Four documentary, Vekselberg revealed that he had spent just over $100 million purchasing the nine Fabergé Imperial eggs from the Forbes collection. He claims never to have displayed them in his home, saying he bought them because they are important to Russian history and culture, and he believed them to be the best jewelry art in the world. In the same BBC documentary, Vekselberg revealed plans to open a museum to display the eggs in his collection. The result was the Fabergé Museum in Saint Petersburg, Russia, which had its official opening ceremony on November 19, 2013.

In September 2006, Vekselberg agreed to pay approximately $1 million in expenses to transport the Lowell House Bells from Harvard University in the United States back to their original location in the Danilov Monastery and to purchase replacement bells.

Vekselberg paid £1.7 million at a Christie's auction in 2005 for Odalisque, a nude said to be the work of Russian artist Boris Kustodiev. However, soon after the purchase, experts working for Vekselberg's art fund, Aurora, began to cast doubt on the picture's authenticity. They claimed that Kustodiev's signature, dated 1919, was done in aluminium-based pigment not available until after the artist's death in 1927. Vekselberg sued Christie's, and the judge ruled in July 2012 that he was entitled to recover the £1.7 million that he paid for the painting, plus Christie's was ordered to pay around £1 million in costs.

== Personal life ==
He is married to Marina and has two children, a daughter and a son. He identifies himself as multi-national and does not attend weekly synagogue or church services. He has also identified as Jewish.

He has a daughter and grandson who live in New York.

Vekselberg reportedly lives in Switzerland.
