= First Hen (Fabergé egg) =

1885 Imperial Fabergé egg

First Hen Fabergé egg
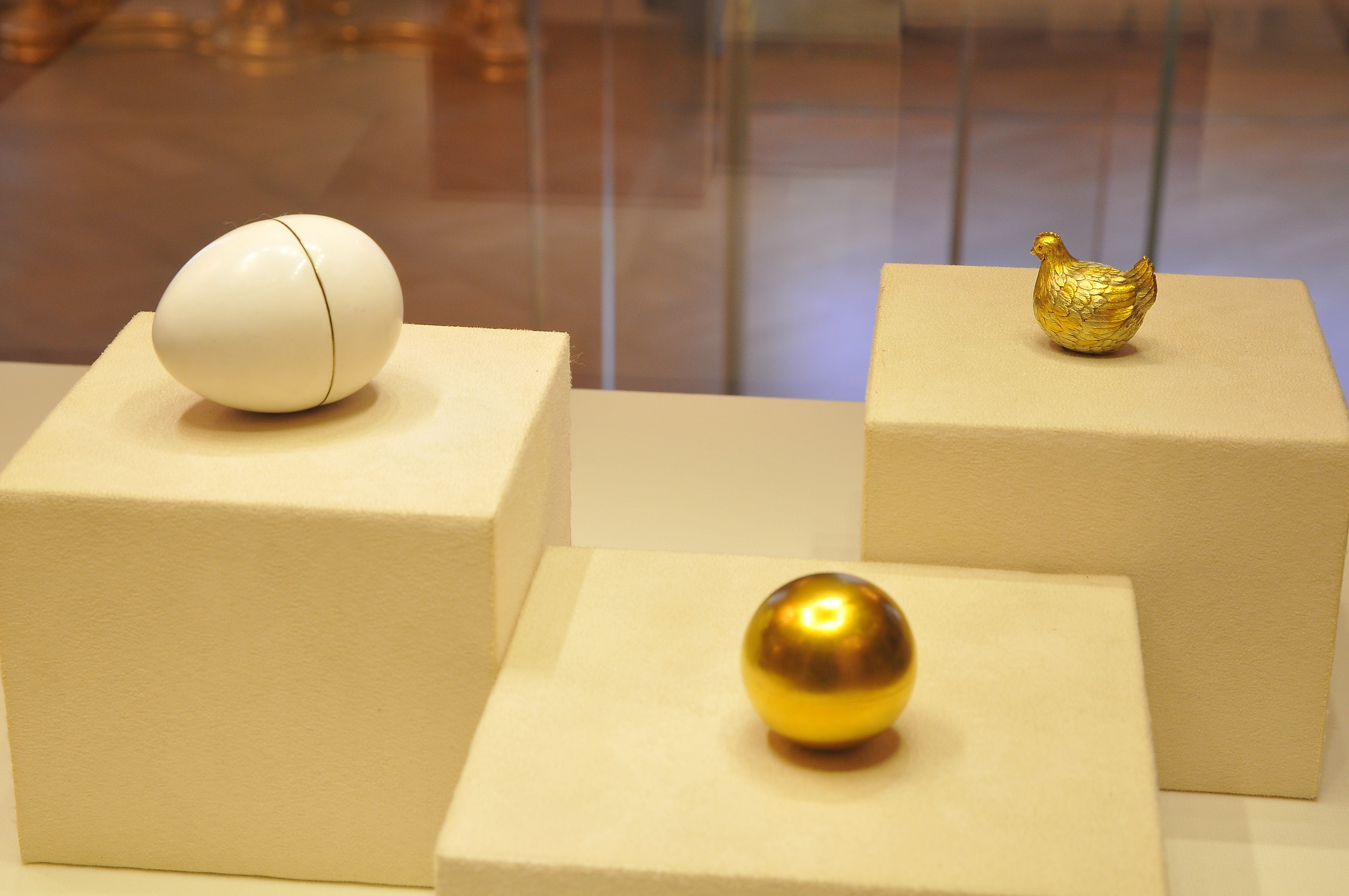
- Year delivered: 1885
- Customer: Alexander III
- Recipient: Maria Feodorovna

Current owner
- Individual or institution: Viktor Vekselberg; Fabergé Museum in Saint Petersburg, Russia
- Year of acquisition: 2004

Design and materials
- Workmaster: Erik Kollin
- Materials used: Gold, opaque white vitreous enamel, rubies, ruby pendant, diamonds
- Height: 64 millimetres (2.5 in)
- Width: 35 millimetres (1.4 in)
- Surprise: The egg opens to reveal a gold yolk. Inside the yolk is a gold hen which opened to reveal a diamond and gold crown which contained a ruby pendant. The crown and pendant are now missing.

The First Hen egg or Jeweled Hen egg is an Imperial Fabergé egg. It became the first in a series of more than 50 such jeweled eggs made under the supervision of Peter Carl Fabergé for the Russian Imperial family. It was delivered to Tsar Alexander III and given to his wife Maria Feodorovna in 1885. The tsarina enjoyed the egg so much that Alexander III quickly placed a standing order with Fabergé to create a new egg for his wife every Easter thereafter, requiring only that each egg be unique and that it contain some kind of "surprise" within it. This particular egg is now a part of the permanent collection of the Fabergé Museum in Saint Petersburg, Russia.

== Design ==
While Fabergé was the owner of his workshop and while all of the eggs produced there are considered "Fabergé eggs", Fabergé himself is not known to have ever participated in the actual construction of any of them, even the first. The crafting of the first Imperial egg is instead attributed to Erik Kollin of Fabergé's workshop. It is made of gold completely coated with opaque white enamel to look like a real egg. A thin band of gold where the two halves of the shell are joined is visible around the middle of the egg.

== Surprise ==
The two halves of the outer shell fit together in a bayonet-style fitting which opens when twisted to reveal the egg's "surprise", a round "yolk" of gold with a matte finish. This yolk itself opens to reveal a varicolored gold hen set with ruby eyes. The hen is hinged on the tail feathers which allows it to also open up to reveal still two further surprises, a gold and diamond replica of the imperial crown and a tiny ruby pendant that was suspended within it on a chain, both of which are now lost.

== History ==
=== Egg ordered by the Tsar ===
In the 19th century, Russian Orthodox Christians held Easter as the most important day of the year. Following a strict fast throughout all of Great Lent, Easter was a day of celebration of Christ's resurrection. To celebrate this holiday, Tsar Alexander III's brother, the Grand Duke Vladimir Alexandrovich ordered Peter Fabergé to create an Easter surprise for the Tsarina. Correspondence between the Tsar and his brother dated March 21, 1885 indicates the Grand Duke relayed the Tsar's desires and instructions for the gift to Fabergé rather than the Tsar himself supervising the crafting of the egg. Amid terrorist attempts on the Imperial family's lives, the Tsar wanted to give his wife something that would take her mind off worries for the Easter of 1885. Fabergé created an egg inspired by one the Tsarina knew from her childhood as a princess of Denmark's royal court. The egg, still in the Royal Danish Collection, is made of ivory instead of gold, has a ring instead of a pendant inside, and dates to the 18th century. Fabergé undoubtedly chose the design because the Tsarina would have recognized the design from her youth. The design delighted both the Tsar and Tsarina so much the Alexander III ordered one for the next Easter and granted Fabergé "permission...to bear the title Supplier to the Imperial Court with the right to bear the State Coat of Arms in his shop's sign".

=== History after presentation to Tsarina ===
The Tsarina was impressed and delighted by the Easter gift from her husband. The egg was kept in the Anichkov Palace until the 1917 revolutions. At that time the revolutionaries seized the First Hen Egg along with most of the other imperial eggs and sent it to the Armory Palace of the Kremlin. A London dealer named either Derek or Frederick Berry purchased the egg from Russian officials around 1920, probably in either Berlin or Paris. Christie's of London sold the egg as lot 55 of the Berry Collection for £85 ($430) to Mr Alfred Suenson-Taylor in 1934. Taylor was made Lord Grantchester in 1955, and the egg formed part of the Grantchester estate when both Lord and Lady Taylor died within months of one another in 1976. A La Vieille Russie of New York acquired the egg from the estate and sold it, together with the Resurrection Egg, to Forbes Magazine Collection in 1978. Viktor Vekselberg purchased the First Hen Egg along with eight other imperial eggs from Forbes, together with the entire Forbes Fabergé collection, before they were to be auctioned. Vekselberg then returned the eggs to Russia where they are now on display in the Fabergé Museum in Saint Petersburg.

== Sources ==
- Faber, Toby (2008). Faberge's Eggs: The Extraordinary Story of the Masterpieces That Outlived an Empire. Random House. ISBN 978-1-4000-6550-9.
- Forbes, Christopher; Prinz von Hohenzollern, Johann Georg (1990). FABERGE; The Imperial Eggs. Prestel. ASIN B000YA9GOM.
- Lowes, Will (2001). Fabergé Eggs: A Retrospective Encyclopedia. Scarecrow Press. ISBN 0-8108-3946-6.
- Snowman, A Kenneth (1988). Carl Faberge: Goldsmith to the Imperial Court of Russia. Gramercy. ISBN 0-517-40502-4.
