= Renaissance (Fabergé egg) =

1894 Imperial Fabergé egg

Renaissance Egg Fabergé egg
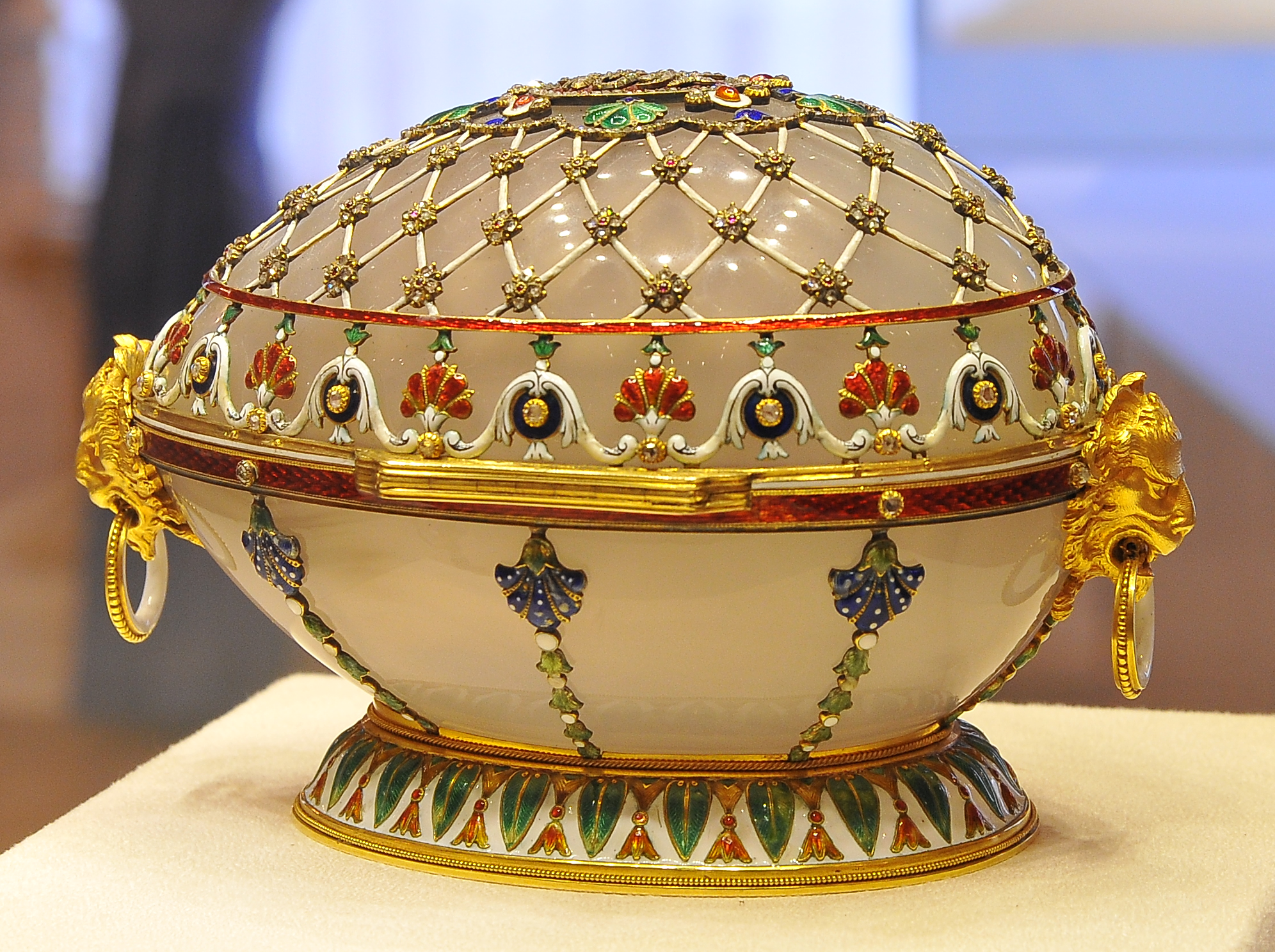
- Year delivered: 1894
- Customer: Alexander III
- Recipient: Maria Feodorovna

Current owner
- Individual or institution: Viktor Vekselberg; Fabergé Museum in Saint Petersburg, Russia
- Year of acquisition: 2004

Design and materials
- Workmaster: Mikhail Perkhin
- Materials used: Agate, gold, green, red and white enamel, rubies and diamonds
- Height: 82 millimetres (3.2 in)
- Width: 82 millimetres (3.2 in)
- Surprise: Resurrection Egg (suspected)

The Renaissance egg is a jewelled agate Easter egg made by Michael Perchin under the supervision of the Russian jeweller Peter Carl Fabergé in 1894. The egg was made for Alexander III of Russia, who presented it to his wife, the Empress Maria Feodorovna.

It was the last Fabergé egg that Alexander presented to Maria.

== Surprise ==
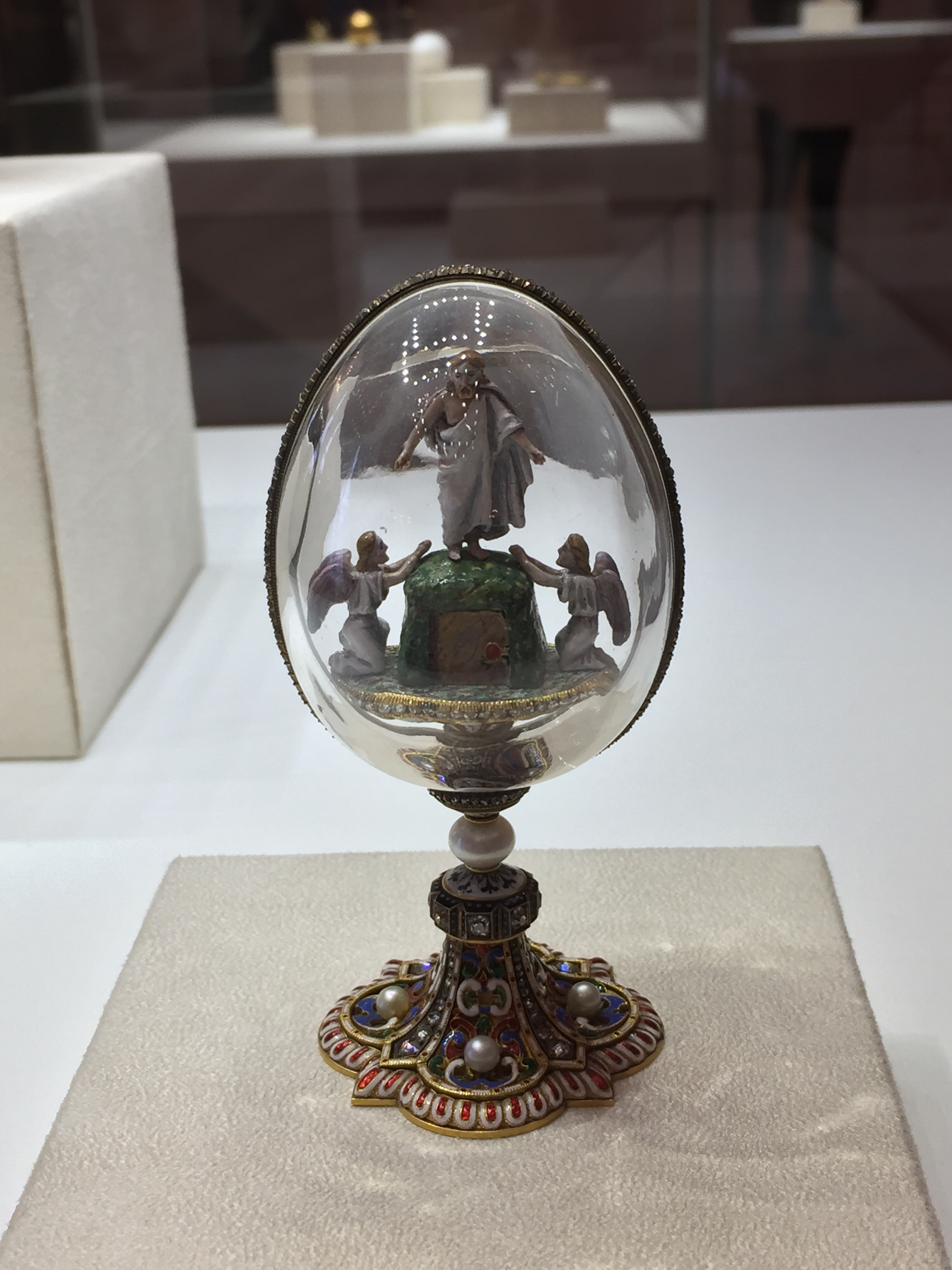
The Resurrection egg is also in the Renaissance style and has pearls in its base.

In Fabergé's invoice the surprise is not mentioned, since "pearls" are mentioned and they are not present in the egg itself, it has been suggested they could be connected with a now lost surprise.

Another hypothesis, advanced by Christopher Forbes, is that the surprise for the Renaissance egg is the Resurrection egg, which perfectly fits the curvature of the Renaissance egg's shell, has a similar decoration in enamel on the base as well as pearls. It was also shown at the same showcase as the Renaissance egg, during a Fabergé exhibition held in the Von Dervis mansion in St. Petersburg in March 1902, where surprises were exhibited out of the Imperial eggs. Likewise, the Resurrection egg has no inventory number, which would speak in favour of this theory.

== History ==
Alexander III was billed 4,750 rubles for the Renaissance egg, and it was confiscated by the Russian Provisional Government in 1917. It was sold alongside nine other eggs for 1,500 rubles to Armand Hammer.

Advertised for sale by Hammer in 1937, it was sold to Henry Talbot DeVere Clifton. It had been sold in November 1949 to the Swingline magnates Jack and Belle Linsky.

Attempting to give their Fabergé collection to the Metropolitan Museum, the Linskys were rebuffed, as the museum stated it was not interested in "Edwardian decorative trivia". The egg was then sold to the Manhattan antique dealers A La Vieille Russie, where it was purchased by Malcolm Forbes for his collection on May 15, 1965.

The Forbes Collection was sold in 2004 to Russian oligarch Viktor Vekselberg. Vekselberg purchased some nine Imperial eggs as part of the collection for almost $100 million.

== Design ==
The piece is based on an 18th-century casket by Le Roy at the Green Vault, Germany.

== Sources ==
- Faber, Toby (2008). Faberge's Eggs: The Extraordinary Story of the Masterpieces That Outlived an Empire. Random House. ISBN 978-1-4000-6550-9.
- Forbes, Christopher; Prinz von Hohenzollern, Johann Georg (1990). FABERGE; The Imperial Eggs. Prestel. ASIN B000YA9GOM.
- Lowes, Will (2001). Fabergé Eggs: A Retrospective Encyclopedia. Scarecrow Press. ISBN 0-8108-3946-6.
- Snowman, A Kenneth (1988). Carl Faberge: Goldsmith to the Imperial Court of Russia. Gramercy. ISBN 0-517-40502-4.
