= Order of St. George (Fabergé egg) =

1916 Imperial Fabergé egg

Order of St. George Fabergé egg
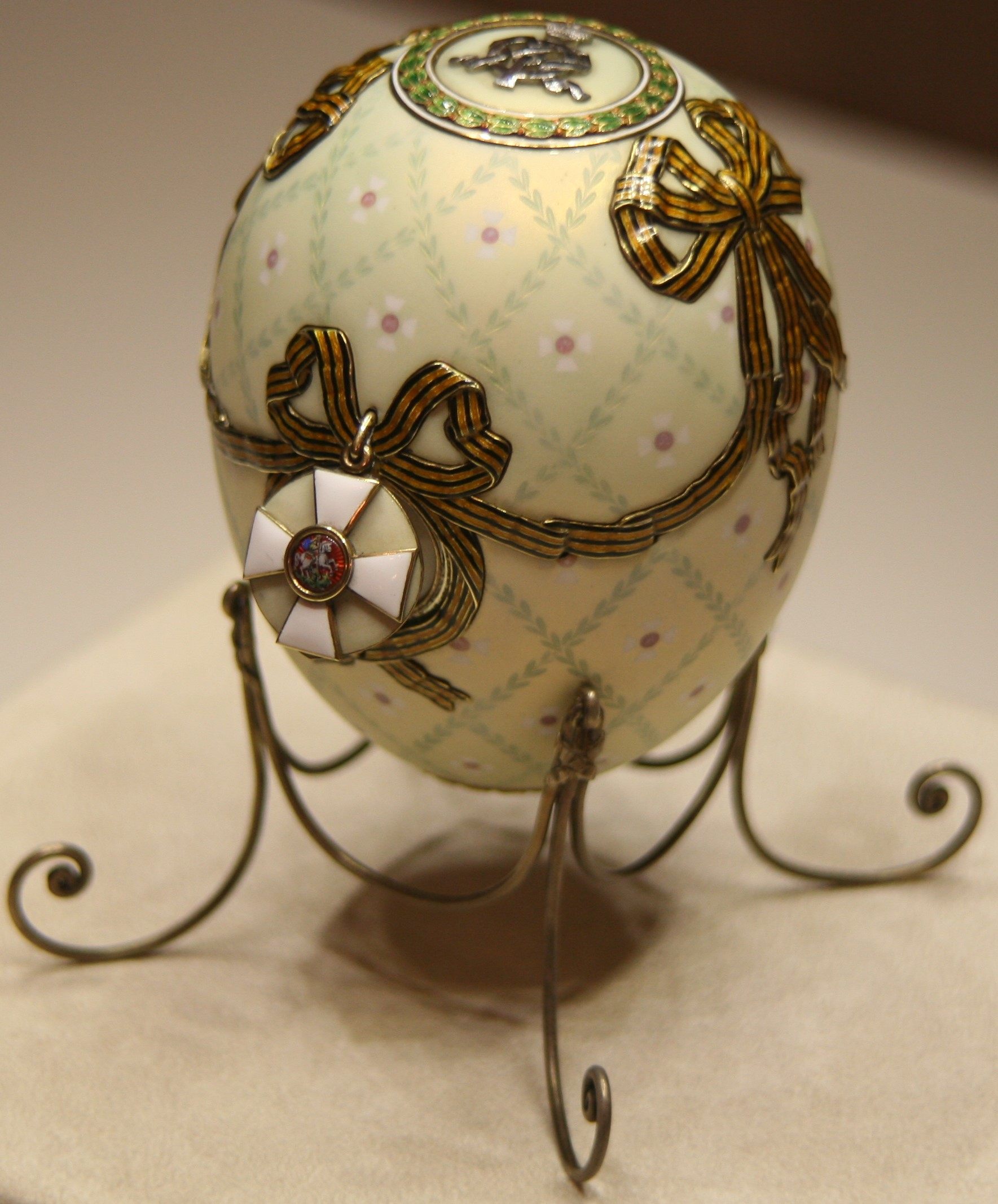
- In the photo is seen the badge of the Order of St. George partially opened, behind which is a miniature portrait of Nicholas II
- Year delivered: 1916
- Customer: Nicholas II
- Recipient: Maria Feodorovna

Current owner
- Individual or institution: Viktor Vekselberg; Fabergé Museum in Saint Petersburg, Russia
- Year of acquisition: 2004

Design and materials
- Materials used: Jewels, enamel
- Surprise: Portraits of Nicholas II and Tsarevich Alexei Nikolaevich below the Crosses of St. George

The Order of St. George Egg, also called the Cross of St. George Egg, is an enameled Easter egg made under the supervision of the Russian jeweller Peter Carl Fabergé in 1916, for Nicholas II of Russia, who presented the Fabergé egg to his mother, the Dowager Empress Maria Feodorovna.

This was the last egg that the Dowager Empress received, as the Karelian Birch egg that was intended for her never reached her.

== Surprise ==
The two surprises are hidden behind two medallions. Behind the badge of the Order of St. George, a miniature portrait of the tsar is revealed when a small button below the badge is depressed. At the opposite side of the egg, a miniature portrait of the tsarevich Alexei is revealed from behind a silver St. George cross depicting Nicholas II, when a button is also depressed.

== History ==
Made during World War I, the Order of St. George egg commemorates the Order of St. George that was awarded to Emperor Nicholas and his son, the Grand Duke Alexei Nikolaievich. The Order of St. George egg, and its counterpart the Steel Military egg were given a modest design, in keeping with the austerity of World War I.

Fabergé billed 13,347 rubles for the two eggs.

The Dowager Empress took the Order of St. George egg with her when she traveled to Kiev in May 1916, thus avoiding the October Revolution. The Russian Provisional Government forced her to travel to the Crimea from where she fled in 1919 on board HMS Marlborough. Maria Feodorovna died in Denmark in 1928, and her jewels were valued at £100,000 by the jeweler R. G. Hennel & Sons.

Several of the jewels were acquired by Queen Mary, and the sale raised £136,624. The Order of St. George egg was inherited by Grand Duchess Xenia Alexandrovna of Russia and after her death in 1960 was sold at Sotheby's for the equivalent of $30,910 to the Fabergé Company.

In 2004 it was sold as part of Forbes Collection to Viktor Vekselberg. Vekselberg purchased some nine Imperial eggs, as part of the collection, for almost $100 million. The egg is now housed in the Fabergé Museum in Saint Petersburg, Russia.

== See also ==
- Egg decorating

== Sources ==
- Faber, Toby (2008). Faberge's Eggs: The Extraordinary Story of the Masterpieces That Outlived an Empire. Random House. ISBN 978-1-4000-6550-9.
- Forbes, Christopher; Prinz von Hohenzollern, Johann Georg (1990). FABERGE; The Imperial Eggs. Prestel. ASIN B000YA9GOM.
- Lowes, Will (2001). Fabergé Eggs: A Retrospective Encyclopedia. Scarecrow Press. ISBN 0-8108-3946-6.
- Snowman, A Kenneth (1988). Carl Faberge: Goldsmith to the Imperial Court of Russia. Gramercy. ISBN 0-517-40502-4.
