= Mauve (Fabergé egg) =

1897 Imperial Fabergé egg

Mauve Fabergé egg
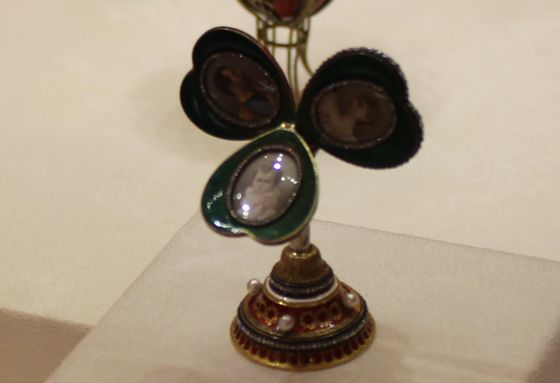
- The opened photo frame surprise
- Year delivered: 1897
- Customer: Nicholas II
- Recipient: Maria Feodorovna

Current owner
- Individual or institution: Fabergé Museum in Saint Petersburg, Russia (surprise only)
- Year of acquisition: 2004

Design and materials
- Materials used: Rose-cut diamonds, strawberry red, green and white enamel, pearls and watercolor on ivory
- Height: 82 millimetres (3.2 in)
- Surprise: A heart shaped photo frame

The Mauve egg is a jewelled Easter egg made under the supervision of the Russian jeweller Peter Carl Fabergé in 1897, for Nicholas II of Russia, who presented it to his mother, the Dowager Empress Maria Feodorovna on April 18, 1897.

One of seven imperial Fabergé eggs which are currently lost, Fabergé billed Nicholas II for the egg, described as a "mauve enamel egg, with 3 miniatures" on May 17, 1897, for 3,250 rubles.

== Surprise ==
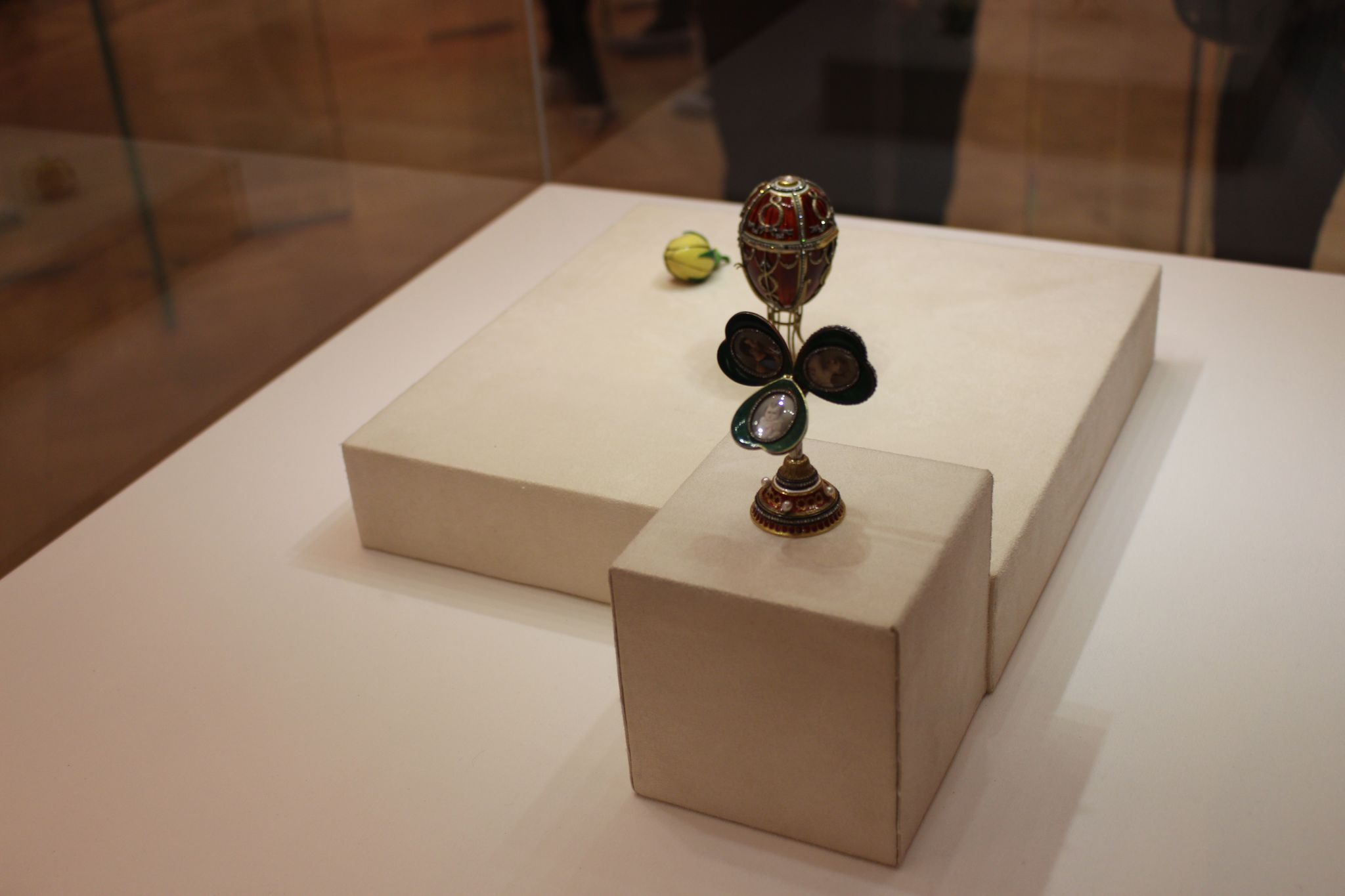

The surprise is a heart shaped photo frame that opened as a three-leaf clover with each leaf containing three miniature portraits of Nicholas II, his wife, the Empress Alexandra Fyodorovna, and their first child, Grand Duchess Olga Nikolaevna. It was made of rose-cut diamonds, strawberry red, green and white enamel, pearls and watercolour on ivory. The surprise is now on display in the Fabergé Museum in Saint Petersburg, Russia.

== See also ==
- Egg decorating
- List of missing treasure

== Sources ==
- Faber, Toby (2008). Faberge's Eggs: The Extraordinary Story of the Masterpieces That Outlived an Empire. Random House. ISBN 978-1-4000-6550-9.
- Forbes, Christopher; Prinz von Hohenzollern, Johann Georg (1990). FABERGE; The Imperial Eggs. Prestel. ASIN B000YA9GOM.
- Lowes, Will (2001). Fabergé Eggs: A Retrospective Encyclopedia. Scarecrow Press. ISBN 0-8108-3946-6.
- Snowman, A Kenneth (1988). Carl Faberge: Goldsmith to the Imperial Court of Russia. Gramercy. ISBN 0-517-40502-4.
