= Fifteenth Anniversary (Fabergé egg) =

1911 Imperial Fabergé egg

Fifteenth Anniversary Fabergé egg
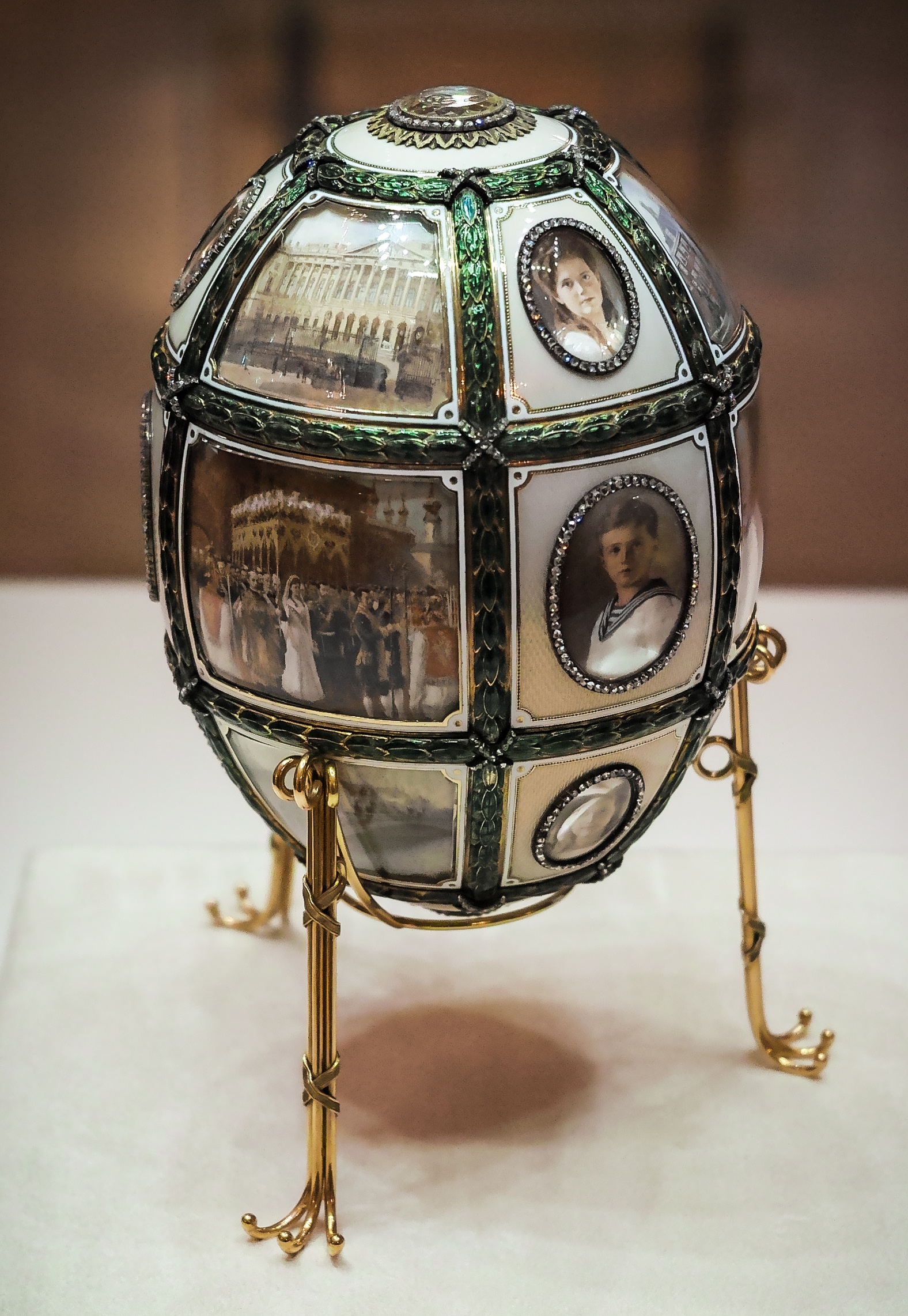
- The egg on its original matching stand
- Year delivered: 1911
- Customer: Nicholas II
- Recipient: Alexandra Feodorovna

Current owner
- Individual or institution: Viktor Vekselberg; Fabergé Museum in Saint Petersburg, Russia
- Year of acquisition: 2004

Design and materials
- Materials used: Gold, green and white enamel, diamonds, rock crystal
- Height: 132 millimetres (5.2 in)
- Surprise: none

The Fifteenth Anniversary Egg is an Imperial Fabergé egg, one of a series of fifty-two jewelled enameled Easter eggs made under the supervision of Peter Carl Fabergé for the Russian Imperial family.

It was an Easter 1911 gift for Tsarina Alexandra Feodorovna from her husband Tsar Nicholas II, who had a standing order of two Fabergé Easter eggs every year, one for his mother and one for his wife.

Its 1911 counterpart presented to the Dowager Empress is the Bay Tree Egg.

== Design ==
The egg is made of gold, green and white enamel, decorated with diamonds and rock crystal. The surface is divided into eighteen panels set with 16 miniatures.

The egg's design commemorates the fifteenth anniversary of the coronation of Nicholas II on 26 May 1896.

There is no "surprise" in the egg—contrary to the Tsar's explicit instructions with regard to these eggs, and without explanation, apparently none was ever made.

== Provenance ==
It was owned by Malcolm Forbes in the Forbes Collection. Viktor Vekselberg purchased nine Imperial eggs, as part of the collection, for almost $100 million. It is estimated that the individual egg cost $10 million to $15 million. The egg is now part of the Victor Vekselberg Collection, owned by The Link of Times Foundation and housed in the Fabergé Museum in Saint Petersburg, Russia.
