= Fabergé Museum in Saint Petersburg =

Museum in Saint Petersburg, Russia

Coordinates: 59°56′N 30°20′E

- Музей Фаберже в Санкт-Петербурге
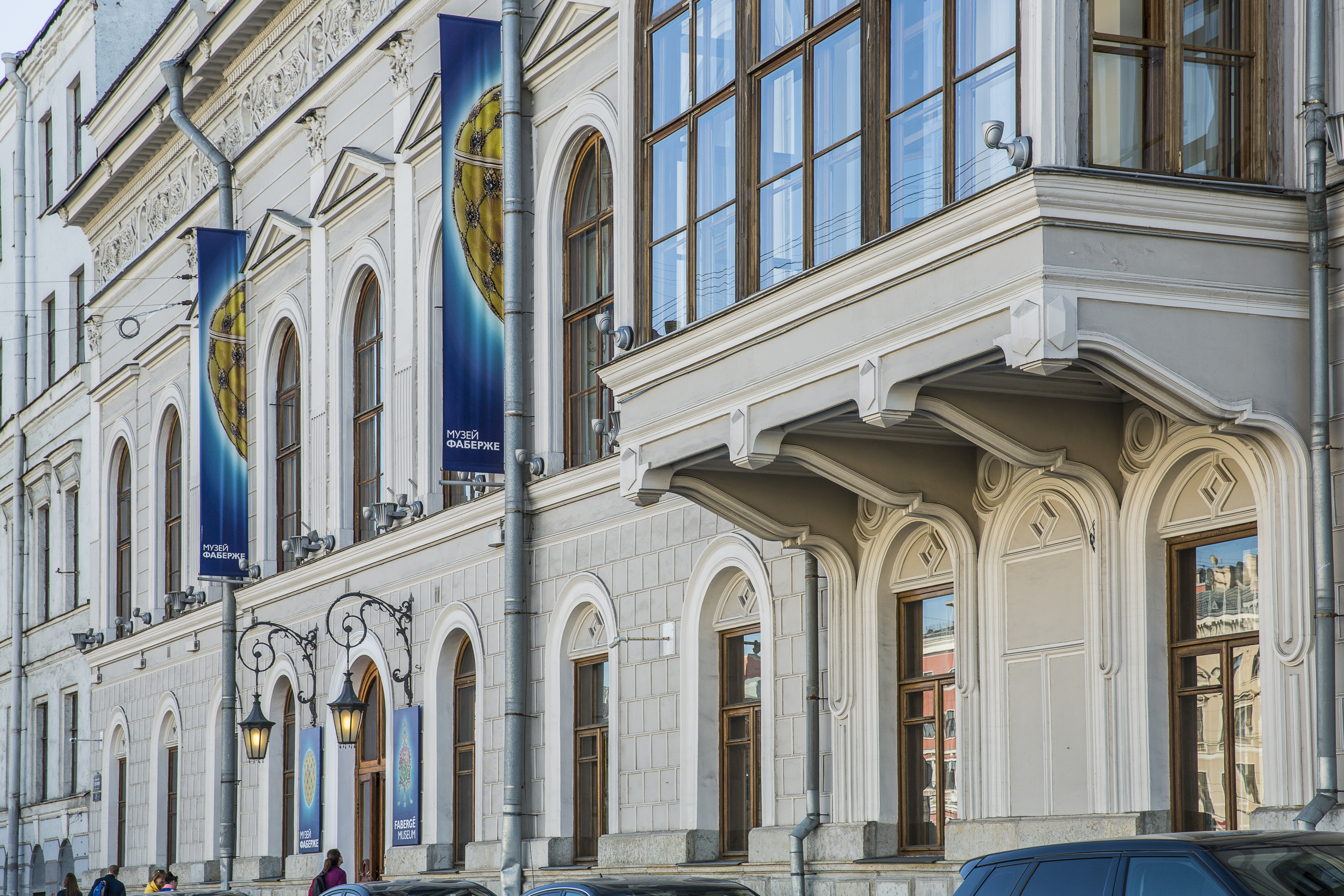
- Established: 19 November 2013
- Location: Naryshkin-Shuvalov Palace; 21, Fontanka River Embankment; Saint Petersburg, Russia
- Collection size: 4,000+ items
- Founder: Viktor Vekselberg
- Director: Vladimir Voronchenko
- Owner: The Link of Times Cultural-Historical Foundation
- Website: fabergemuseum.ru

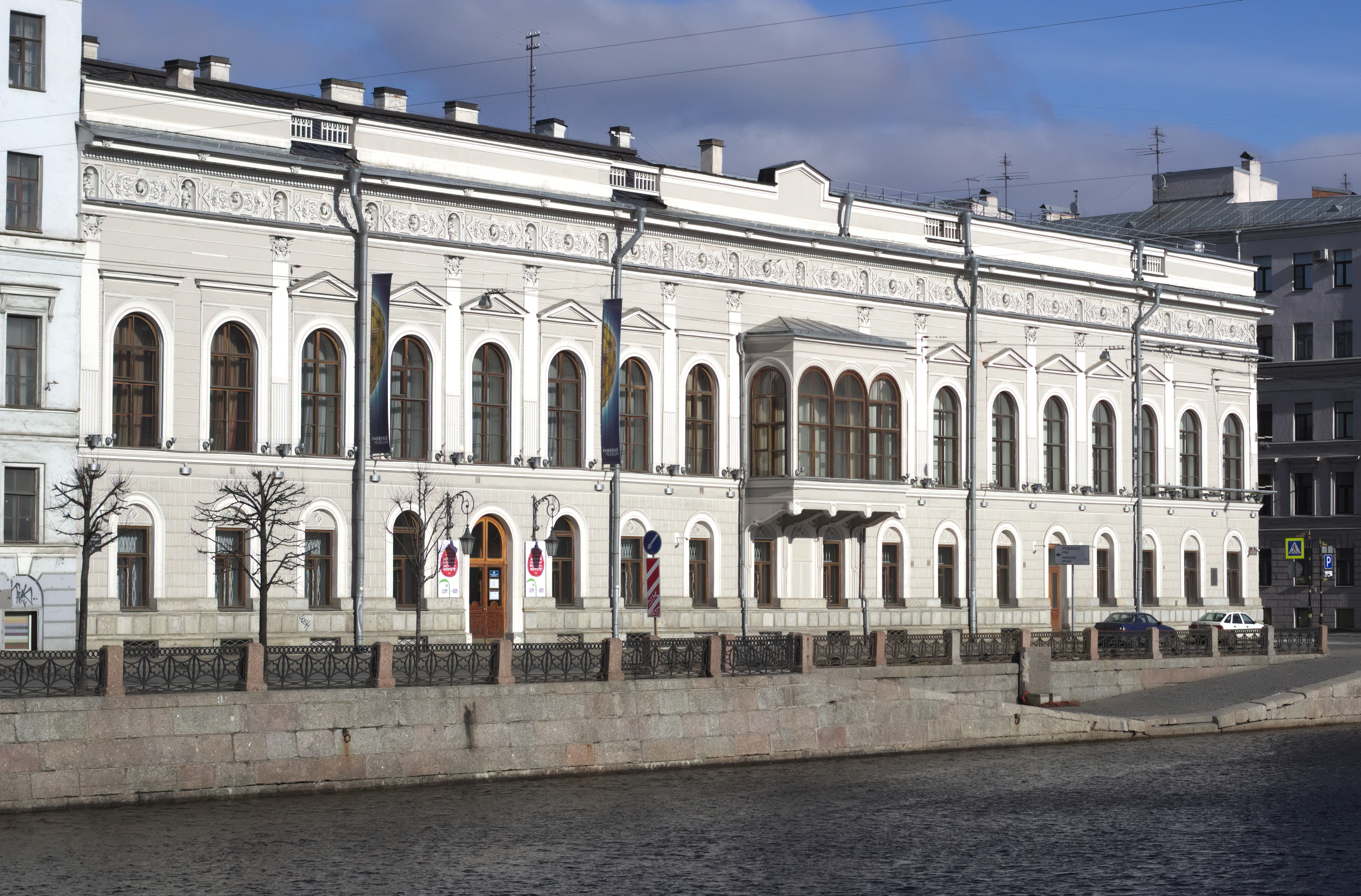
Naryshkin-Shuvalov Palace in 2015

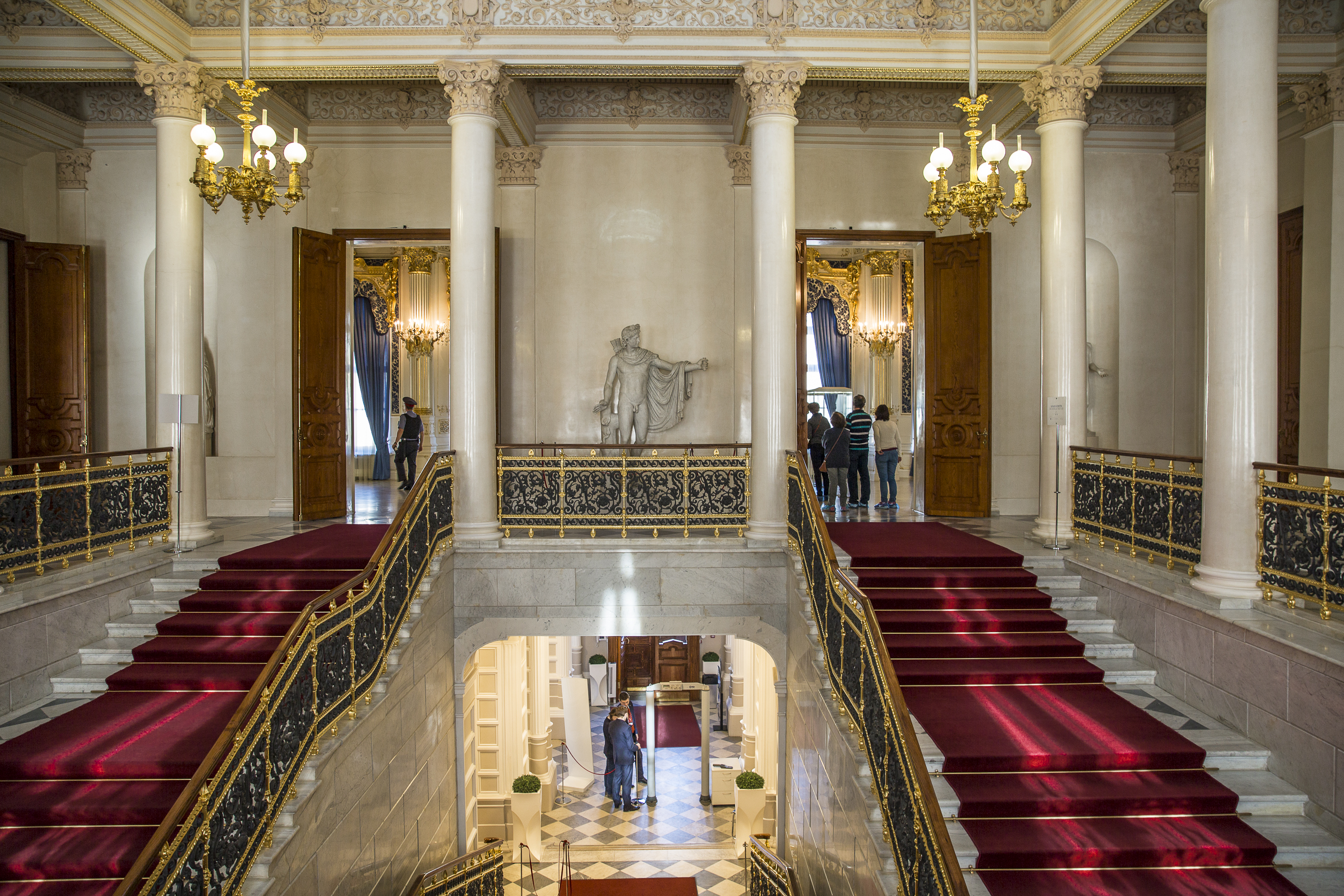
The museum's main staircase

The Fabergé Museum in Saint Petersburg (Russian: Музей Фаберже в Санкт-Петербурге) is a privately owned museum in Saint Petersburg, Russia. It was established by Viktor Vekselberg and his Link of Times foundation in order to repatriate lost cultural valuables to Russia. The museum is located in central Saint Petersburg at the Naryshkin-Shuvalov Palace (21, Fontanka River Embankment) on the Fontanka River. The museum's collection contains more than 4,000 works of decorative applied and fine arts, including gold and silver items, paintings, porcelain and bronze. A highlight of the museum's collection is the group of nine Imperial Easter eggs created by Fabergé for the last two Russian Tsars.

== History ==
The idea of creating a special museum devoted to the creative work of the great Russian jeweler Peter Carl Fabergé came to the Link of Times foundation after the purchase by Viktor Vekselberg in 2004 of a unique collection of Fabergé masterpieces that had been owned by the late Malcolm Forbes. Since then, the Link of Times foundation began building a collection of Russian decorative applied and fine arts, which contains more than 4,000 works. All of the Imperial Easter eggs in the museum's collection are connected to the rule and personal life of the last two Russian emperors: Alexander III and Nicolas II.

The Link of Times foundation began restoring the 18th-century Naryshkin-Shuvalov Palace (which is rented by the foundation) in St. Petersburg in 2006, with the goal of opening the museum in the palace. A significant amount of work was done over seven years to recreate the historical appearance of the palace. This was the first full-fledged restoration of the palace in its entire 200-year history. The official opening ceremony of the Fabergé Museum took place on 19 November 2013.

== The collection ==
The Fabergé Museum's collection has nine Imperial Easter eggs that were made to the order of the last two Romanov Tsars. The eggs were bought by Vekselberg in 2004 from the family of the American newspaper magnate Malcolm Forbes. He purchased them just before they came up for auction, paying $100 million for the Forbes family's entire Fabergé collection.

In total, there are fifteen Fabergé eggs in the Blue Room of Naryshkin-Shuvalov Palace, as well as a miniature picture frame in the form of a heart – the surprise from the lost Mauve egg of 1897.

== List of Imperial Easter eggs ==
- First Hen egg
- Renaissance egg
- Rosebud egg
- Coronation egg
- Lilies of the Valley egg
- Cockerel egg
- Fifteenth Anniversary egg
- Bay Tree egg
- Order of St. George egg
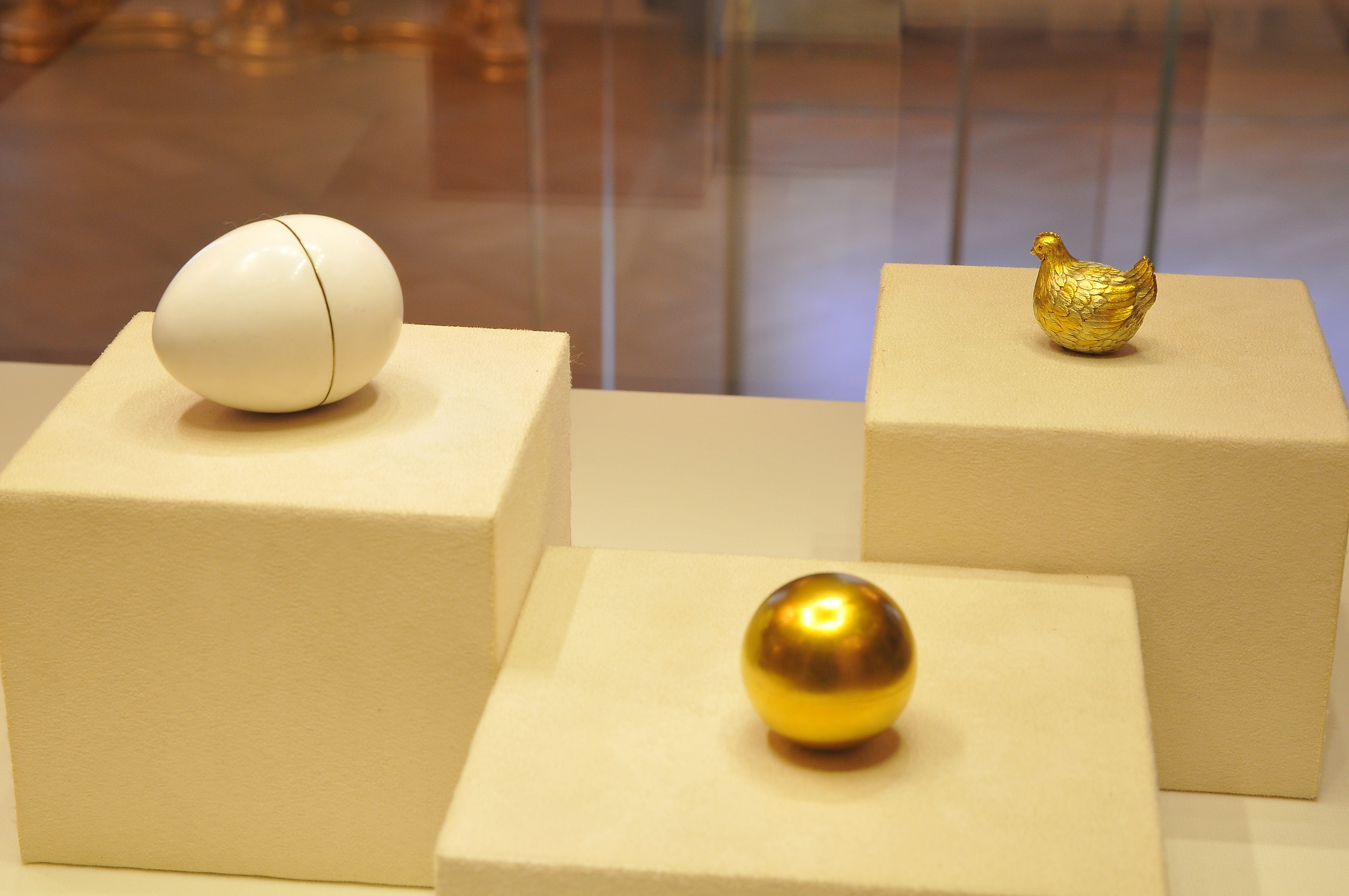
First Hen egg

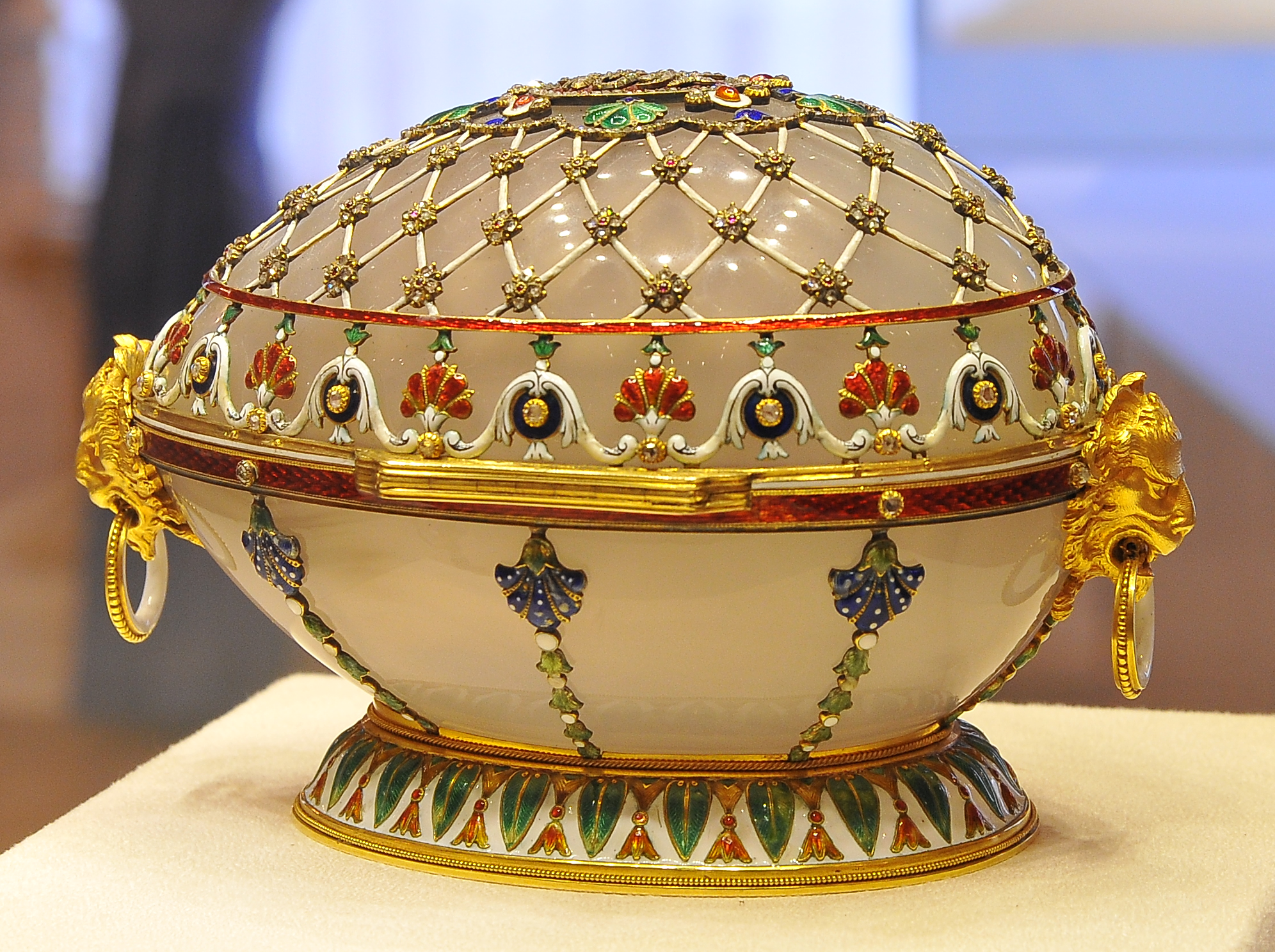
Renaissance egg

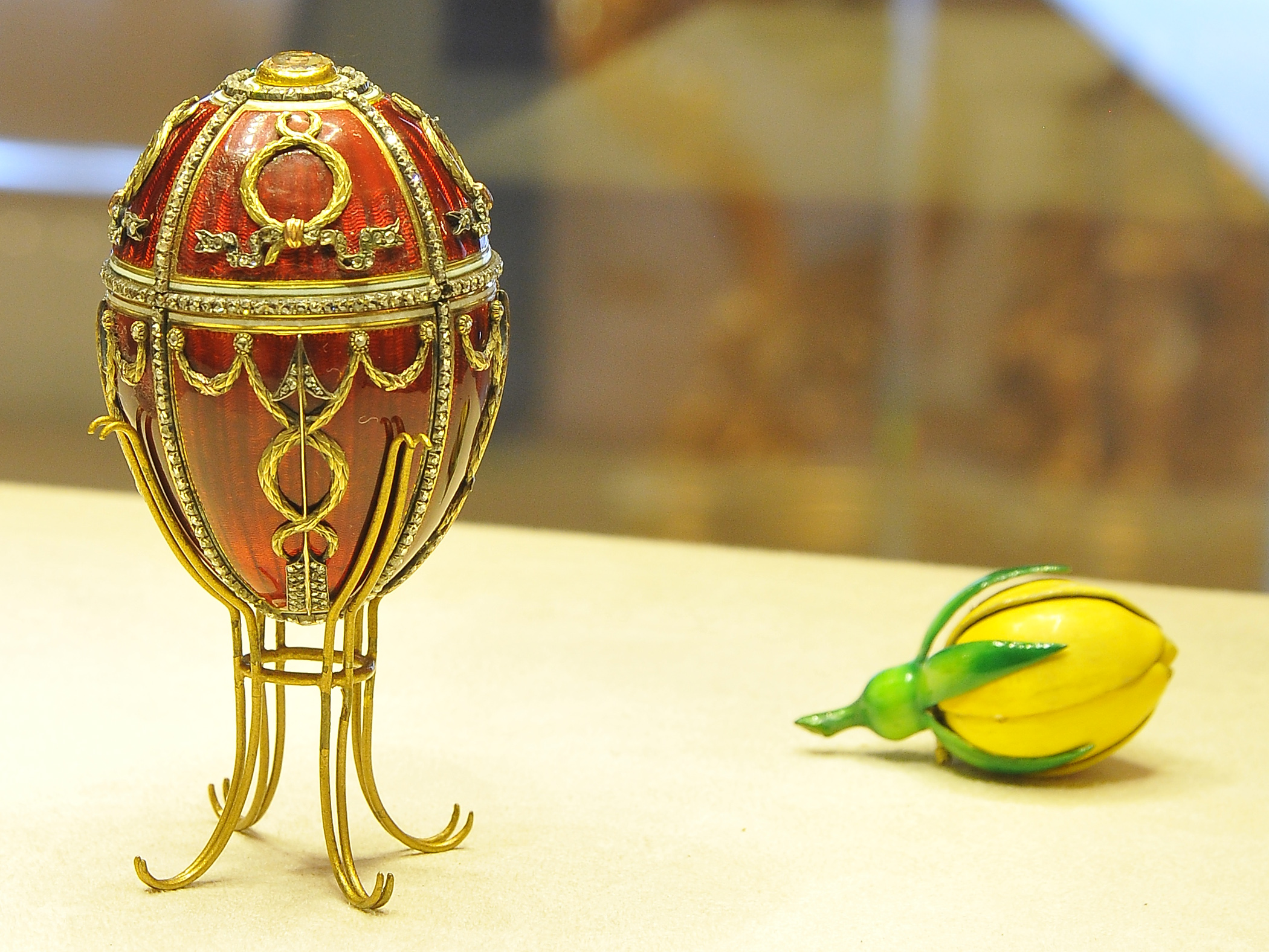
Rosebud egg

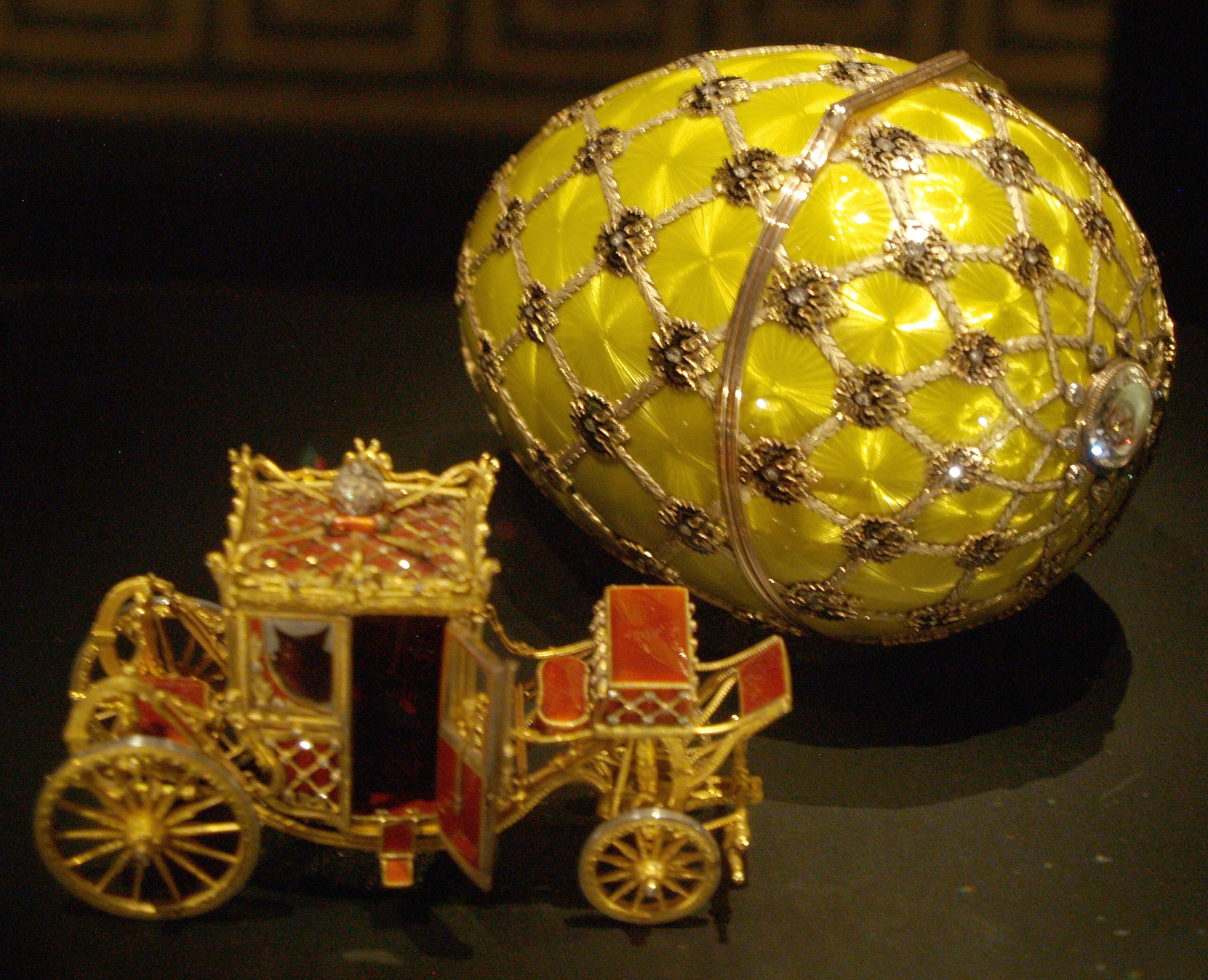
Coronation egg

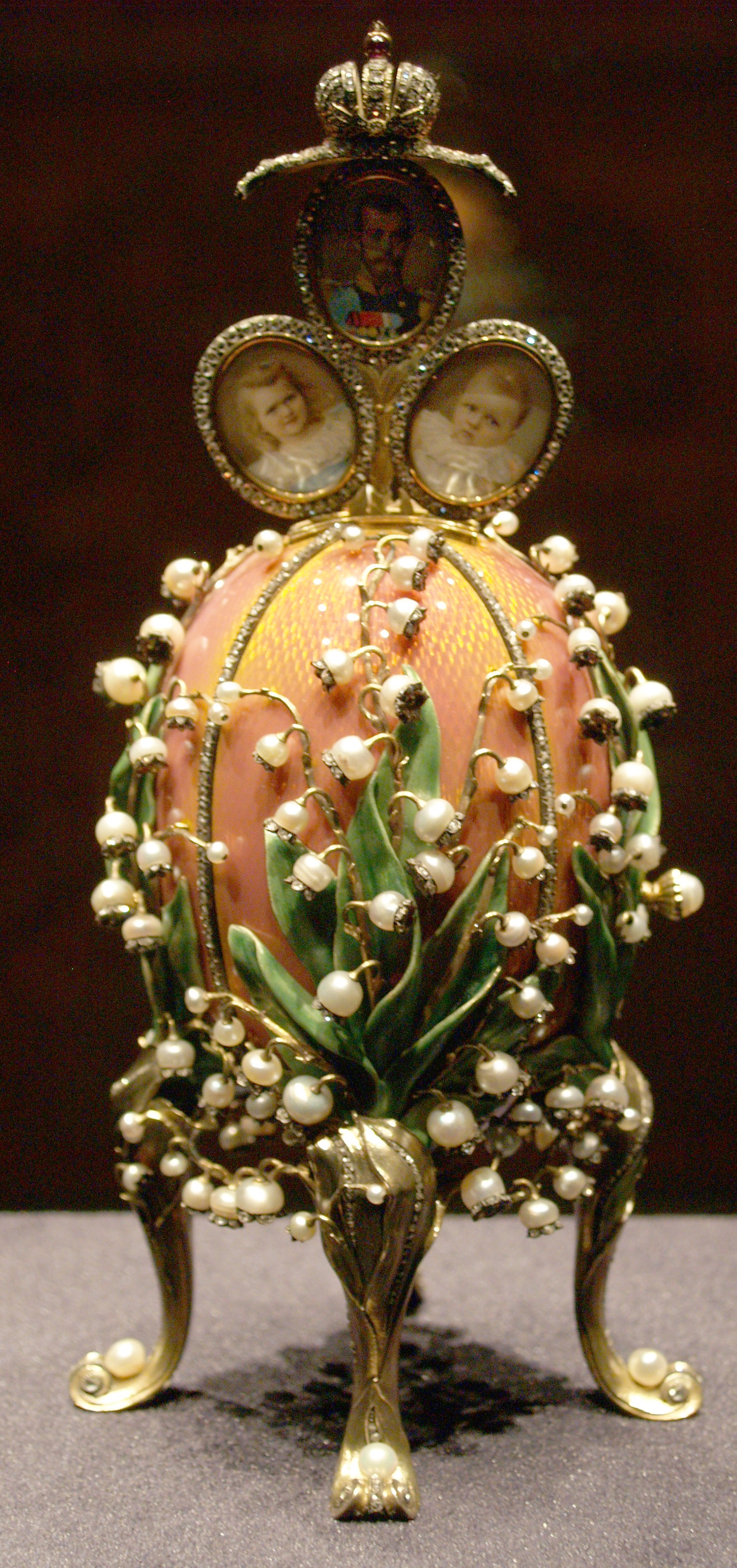
Lilies of the Valley egg

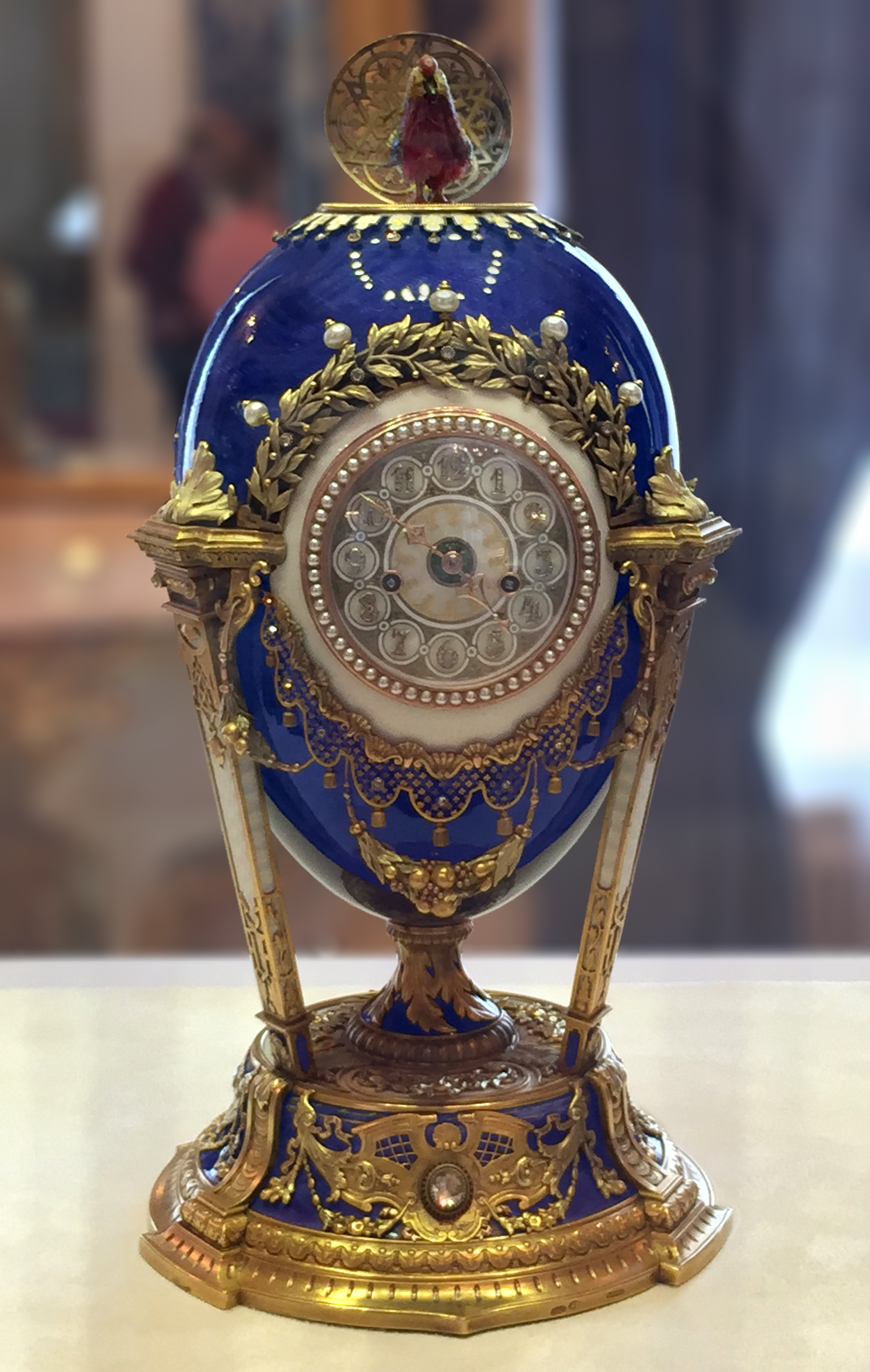
Cockerel egg

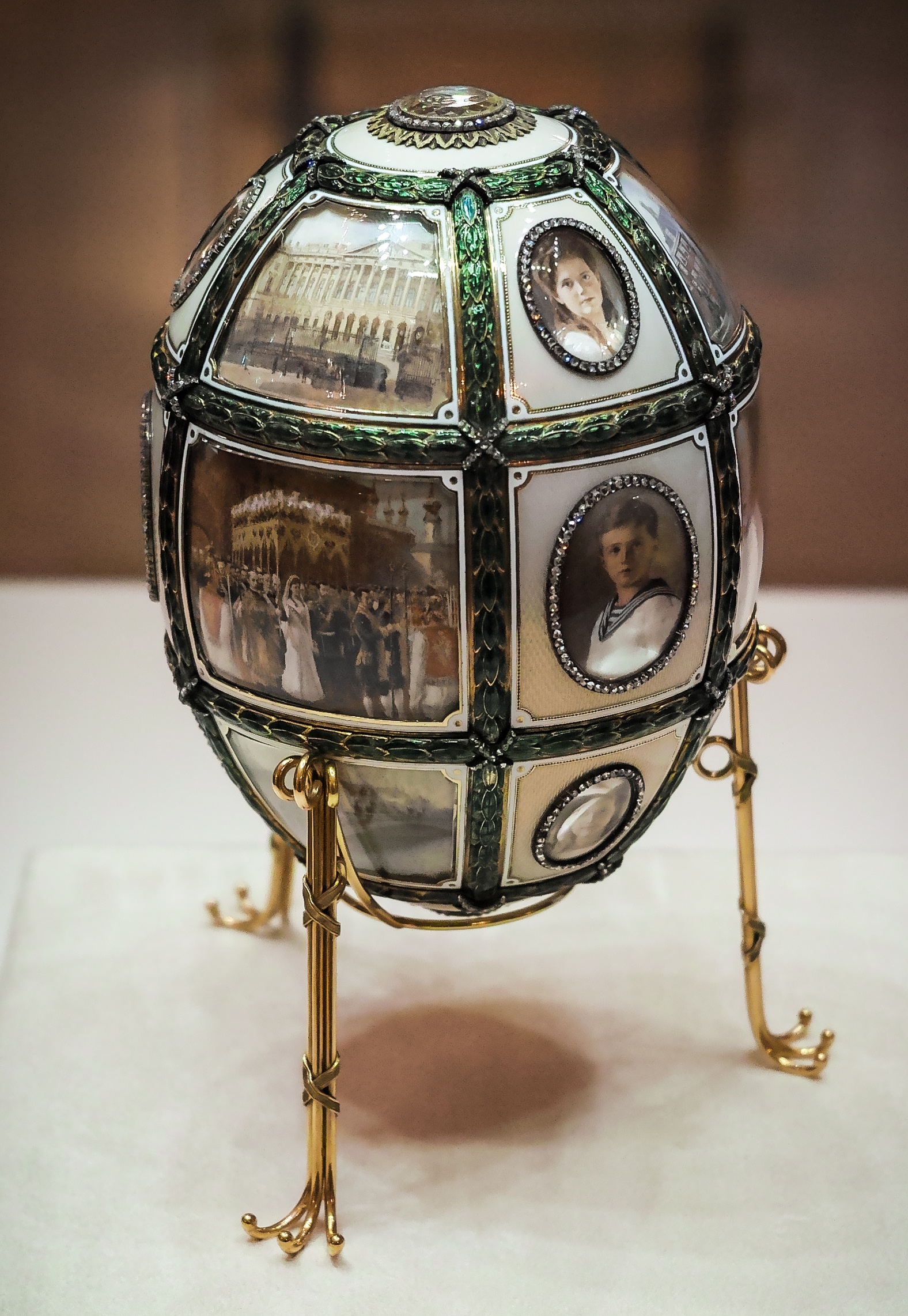
Fifteenth Anniversary egg

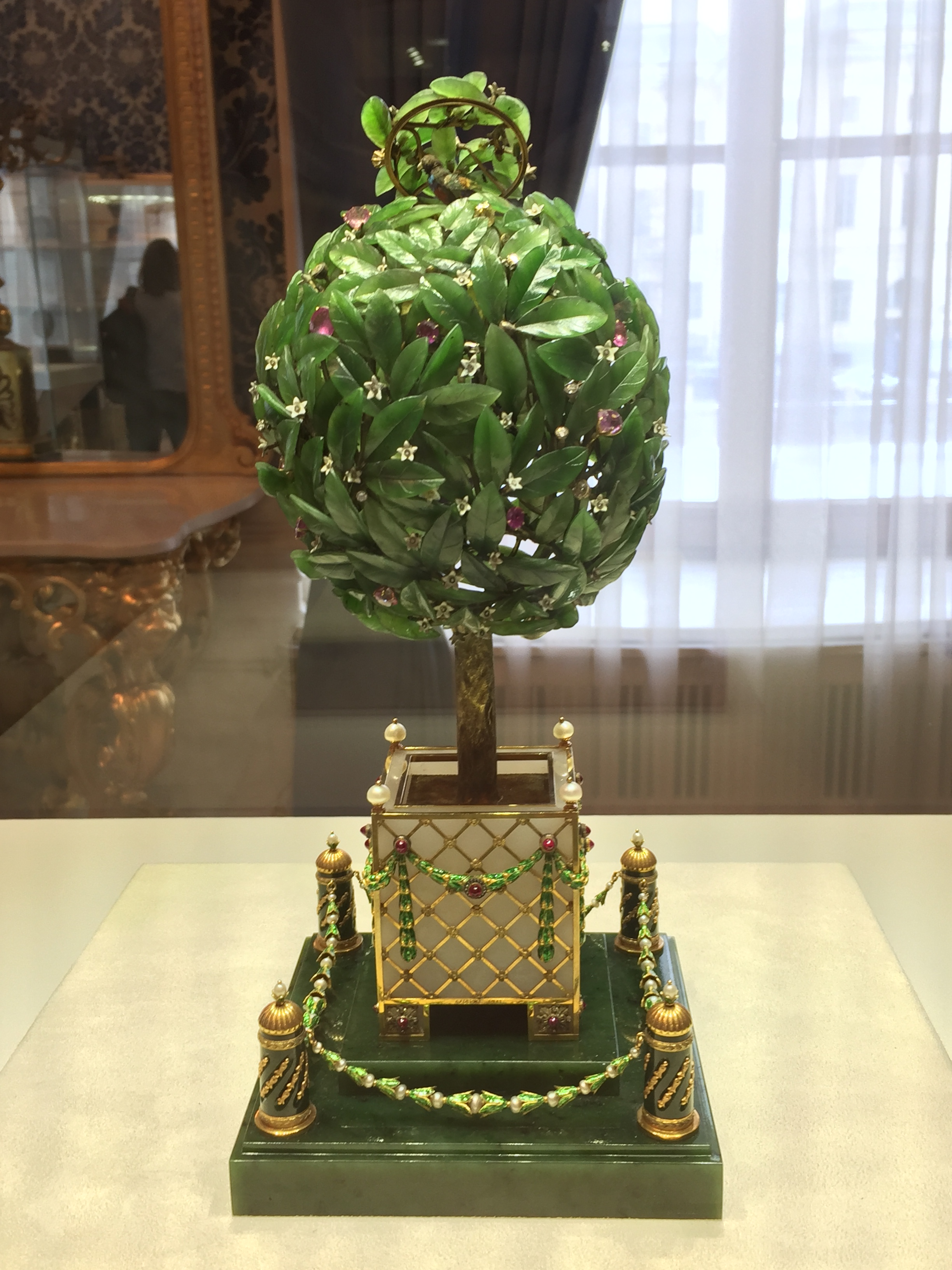
Bay Tree egg

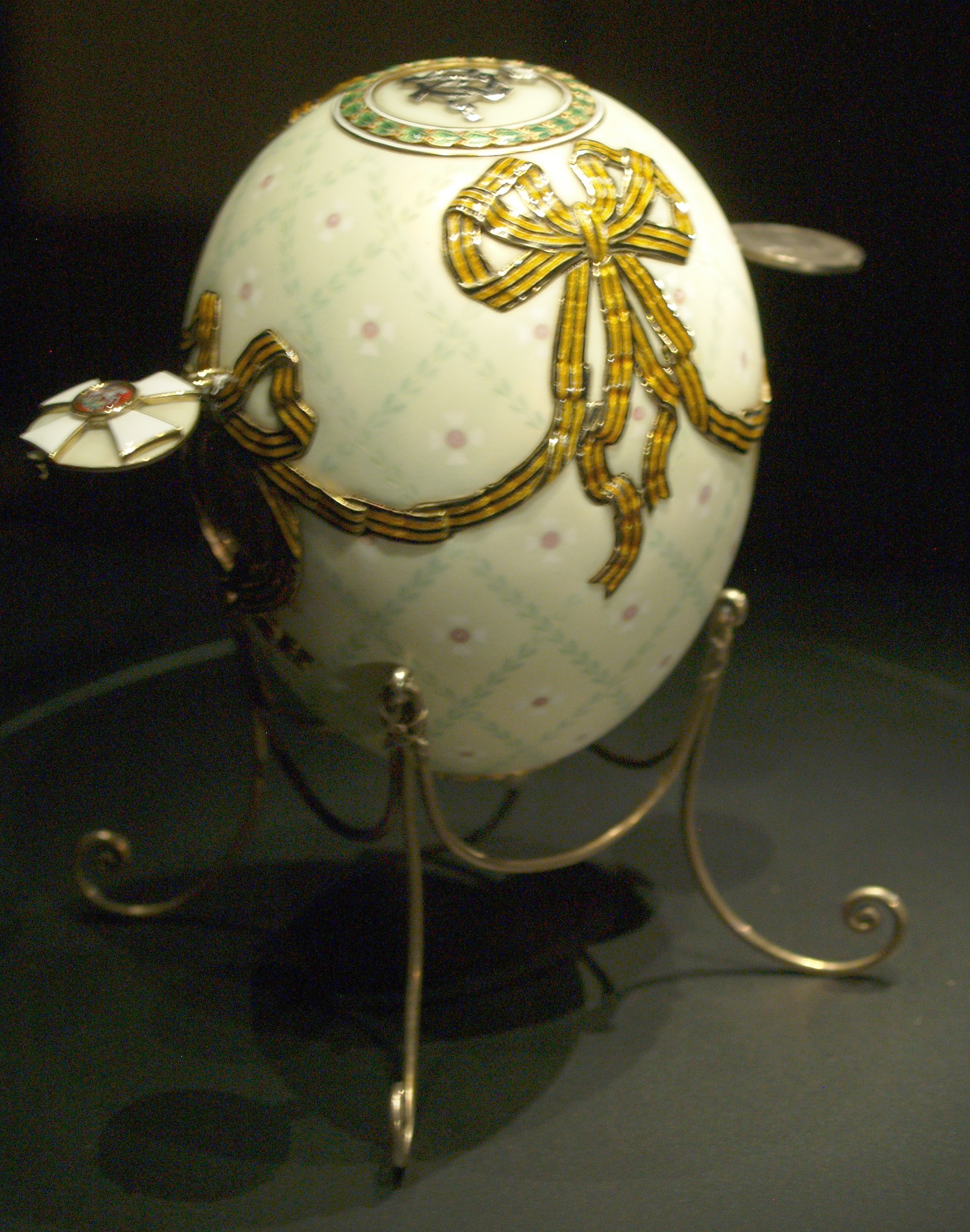
Order of St. George egg

== List of other Fabergé eggs ==
- Kelch Hen egg
- Kelch Chanticleer egg
- Duchess of Marlborough egg
- Resurrection egg
- Scandinavian egg
- Spring Flowers egg
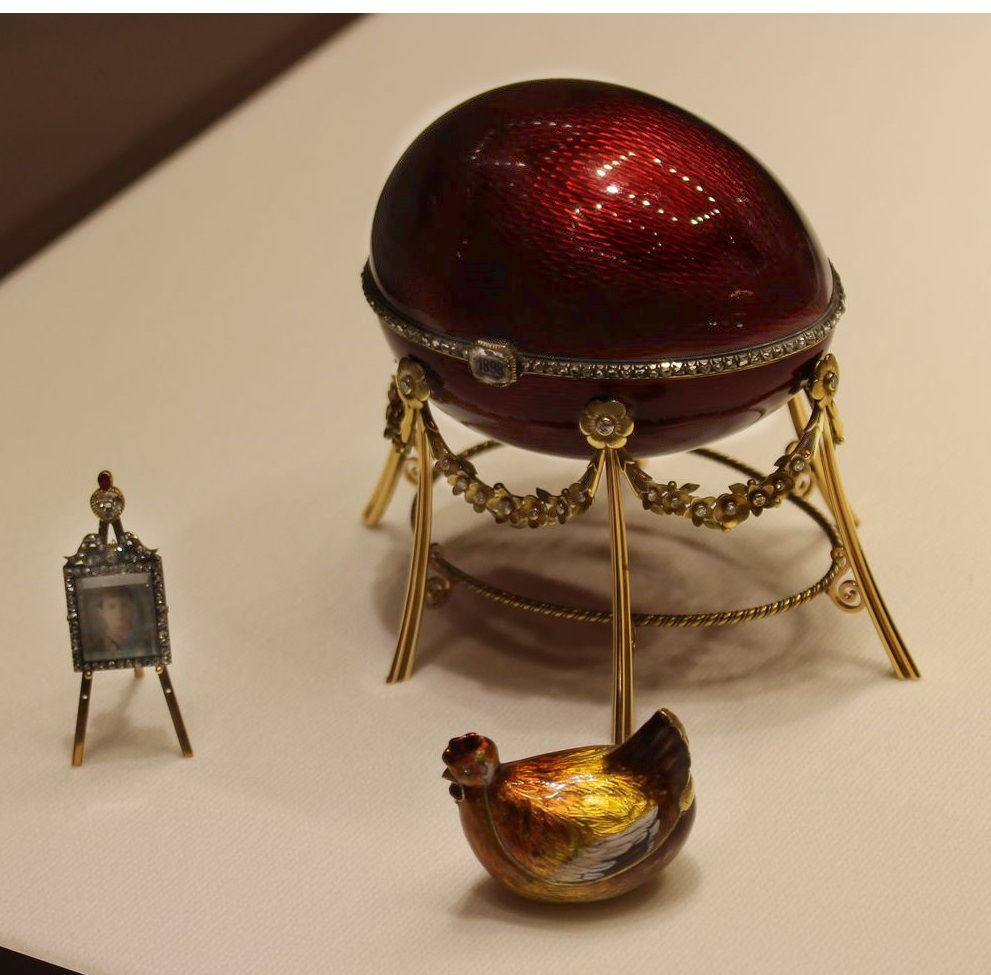
Kelch Hen egg

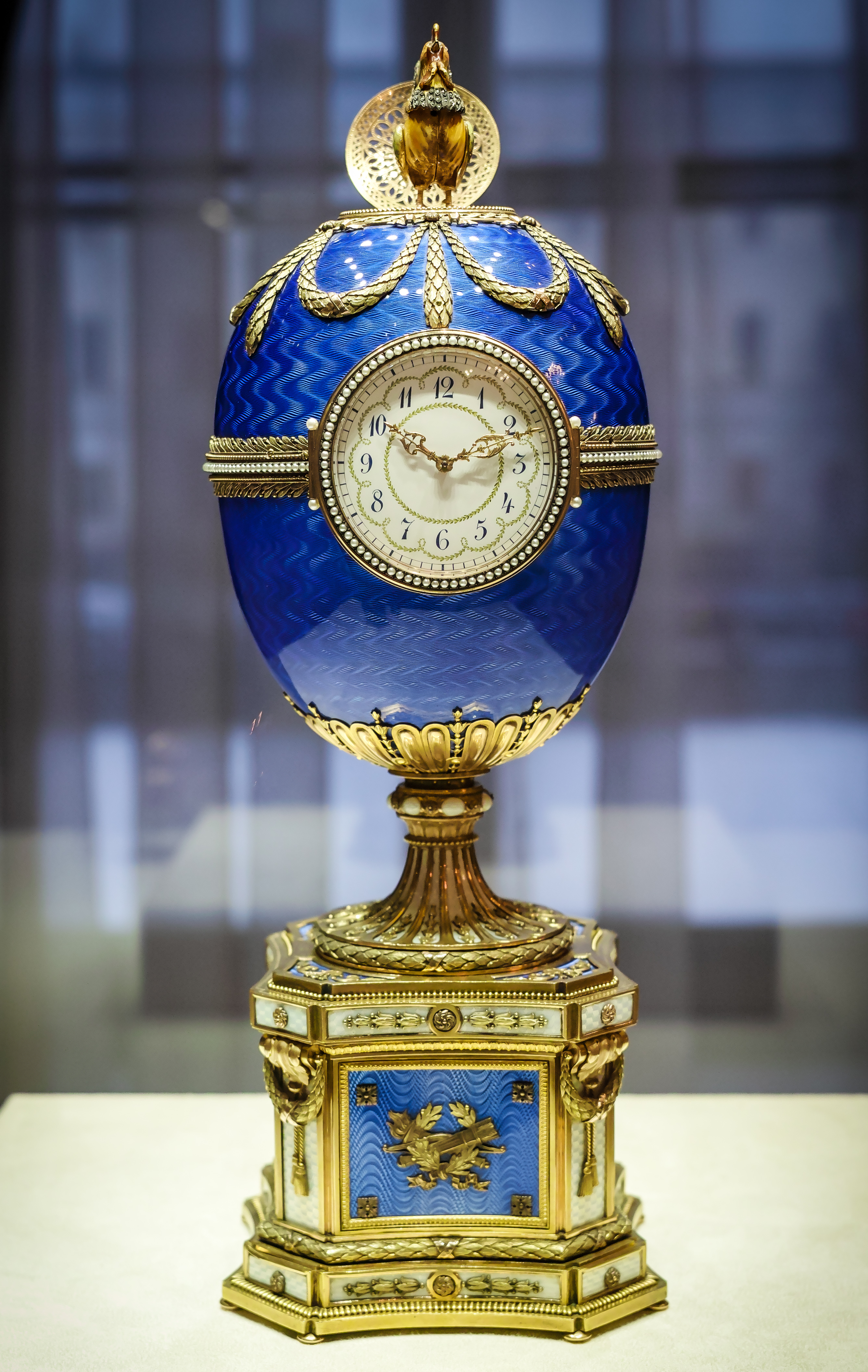
Kelch Chanticleer egg

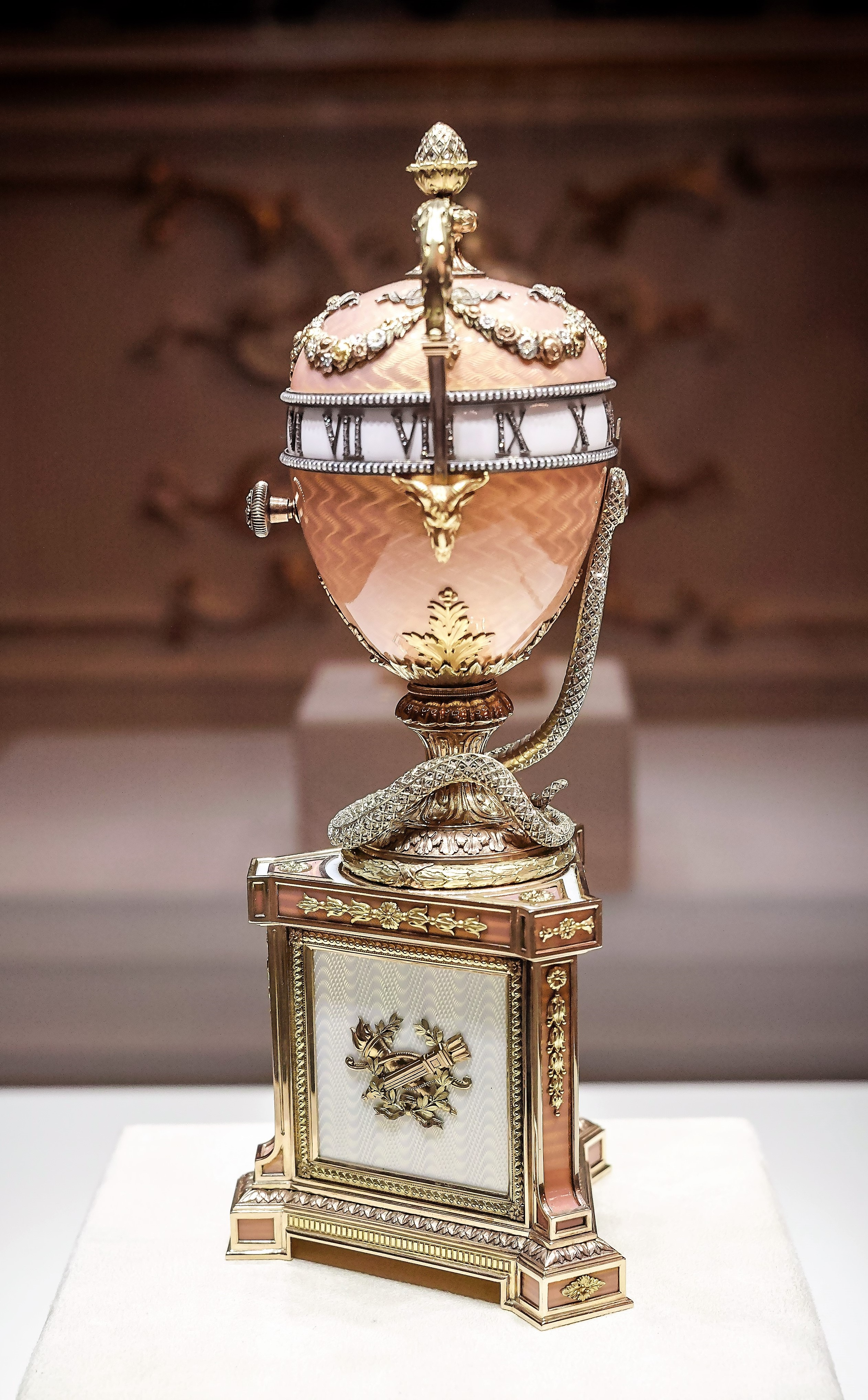
Duchess of Marlborough egg

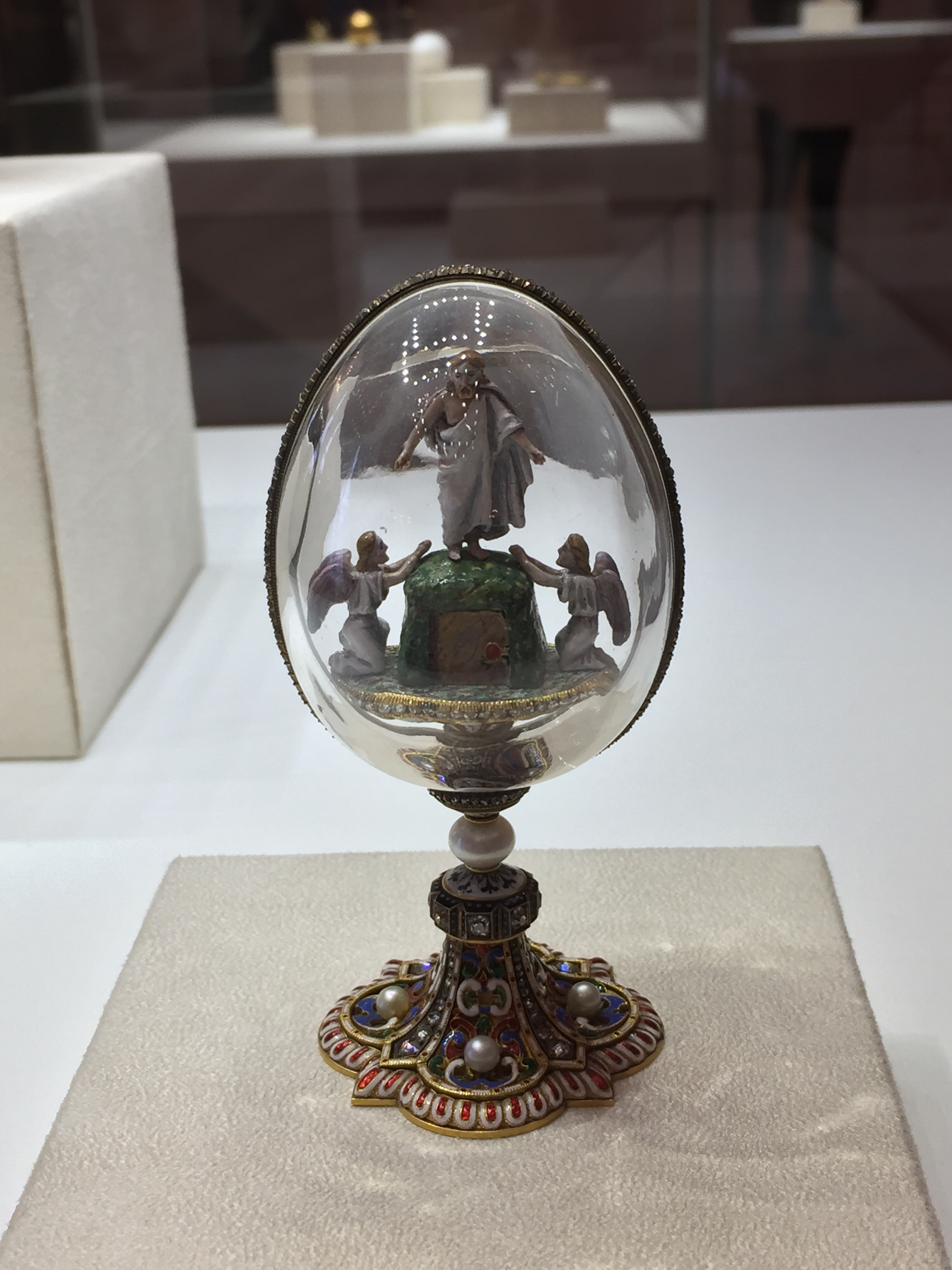
Resurrection egg

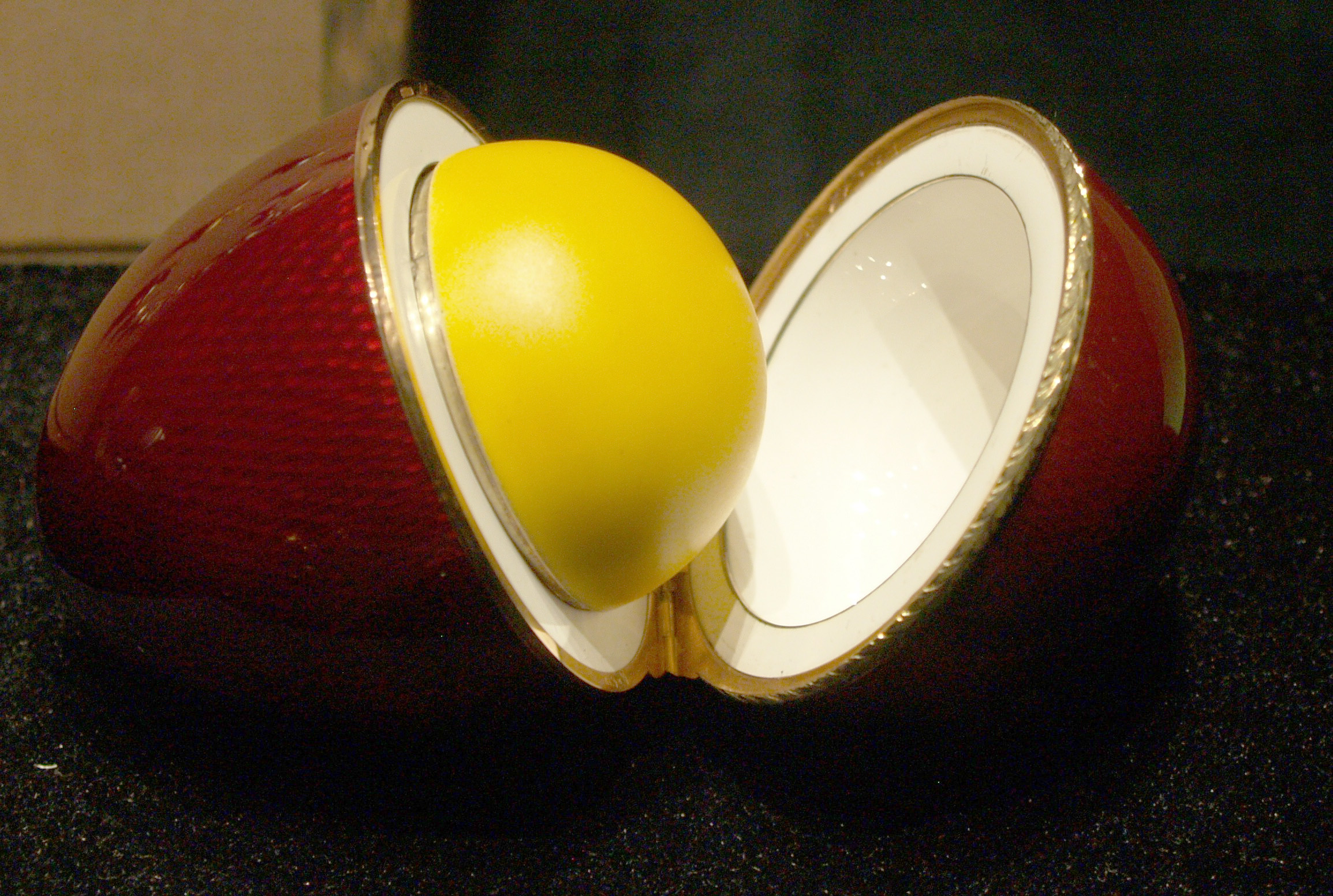
Scandinavian egg

== See also ==
- List of museums in Saint Petersburg
- Fabergé Museum in Baden-Baden
