= Bay Tree (Fabergé egg) =

1911 Imperial Fabergé egg

Bay Tree Fabergé egg
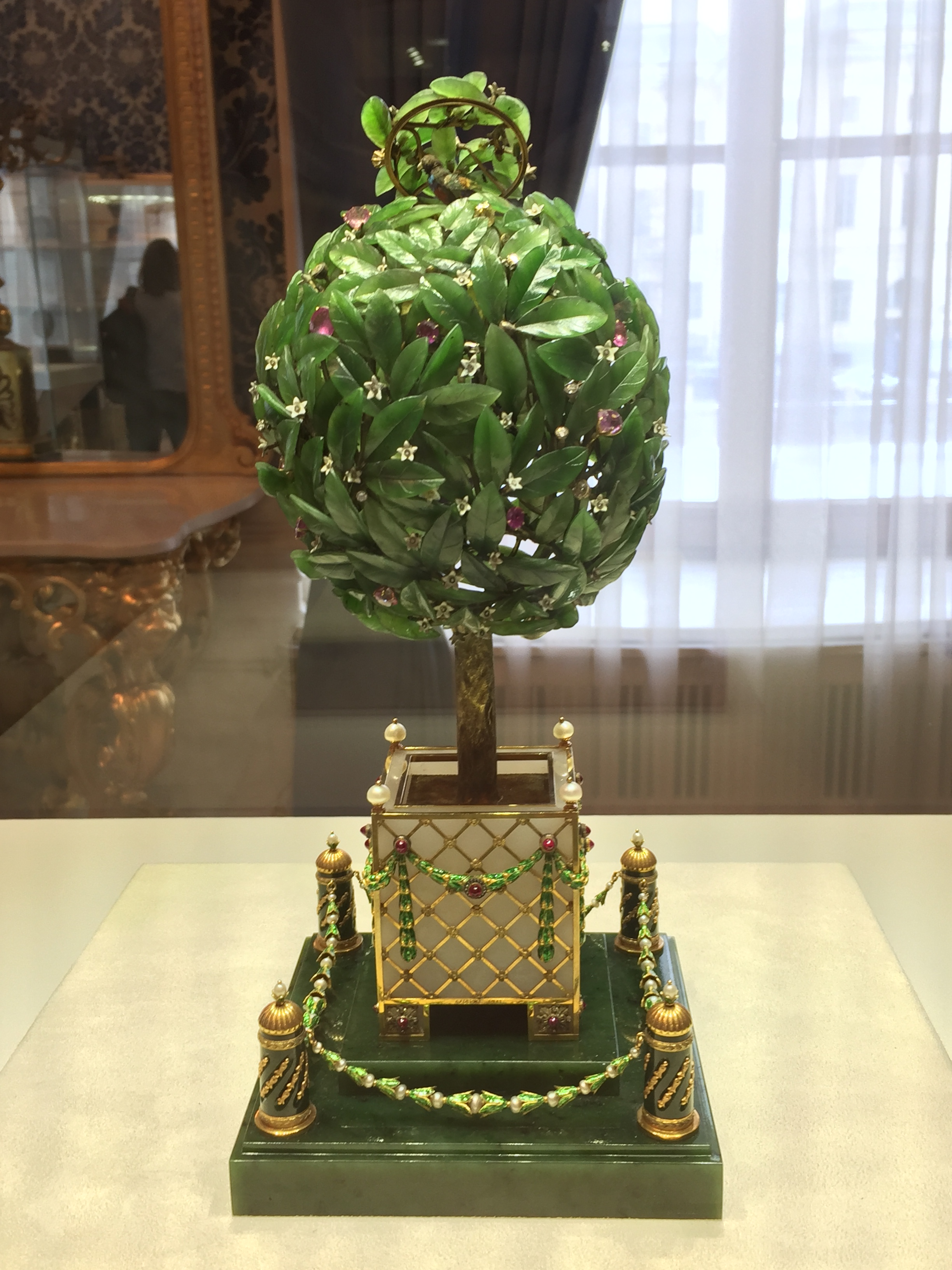
- Year delivered: 1911
- Customer: Nicholas II
- Recipient: Maria Feodorovna

Current owner
- Individual or institution: Viktor Vekselberg; Fabergé Museum in Saint Petersburg, Russia
- Year of acquisition: 2004

Design and materials
- Materials used: Gold, green and white enamel, nephrite, diamonds, rubies, amethysts, citrines, pearls and white onyx
- Height: 273 millimetres (10.7 in) when closed, 300 millimetres (12 in) when opened
- Surprise: Feathered songbird

The Bay Tree egg (also known as the Orange Tree egg) is a jewelled nephrite and enameled Fabergé egg made under the supervision of the Russian jeweller Peter Carl Fabergé in 1911, for Nicholas II of Russia who presented the egg to his mother, the Dowager Empress Maria Feodorovna, on 12 April 1911.

Its 1911 counterpart, presented to the Empress, is the Fifteenth Anniversary egg.

== Surprise ==
Turning a tiny lever disguised as a fruit, hidden among the leaves of the bay tree, activates the hinged circular top of the tree and a feathered songbird rises and flaps its wings, turns its head, opens its beak and sings.

== History ==
Based on an 18th-century French mechanical orange tree, it was incorrectly labeled as an orange tree for some time, but was confirmed as a bay tree after the original invoice from Fabergé was examined. Fabergé charged 12,800 rubles for the egg.

In 1917, the egg was confiscated by the Russian Provisional Government and moved from the Anichkov Palace to the Kremlin. It was sold to Emanuel Snowman of the jewellers Wartski around 1927.

In 1934, Wartski sold it to Allan Gibson Hughes for £950, buying it back from his estate in 1939 after his death. The egg has a fitted case inscribed with the initials A. G. H. which is probably attributable to this period of ownership.

In 1947, it was sold by Sotheby's in London for £1,650 and then passed through several different owners, ending with Mrs. Mildred Kaplan. She sold it to Malcolm Forbes in 1965 for $35,000, equivalent to $212,634 at the time of the 2004 sale of the Forbes Collection to Viktor Vekselberg. Vekselberg purchased some nine Imperial eggs, as part of the collection, for almost $100 million

The egg is now part of the Victor Vekselberg Collection, owned by The Link of Times Foundation and housed in the Fabergé Museum in Saint Petersburg, Russia.

== See also ==
- Egg decorating

== Sources ==
- Faber, Toby (2008). Faberge's Eggs: The Extraordinary Story of the Masterpieces That Outlived an Empire. Random House. ISBN 978-1-4000-6550-9.
- Forbes, Christopher; Prinz von Hohenzollern, Johann Georg (1990). FABERGE; The Imperial Eggs. Prestel. ASIN B000YA9GOM.
- Lowes, Will (2001). Fabergé Eggs: A Retrospective Encyclopedia. Scarecrow Press. ISBN 0-8108-3946-6.
- Snowman, A Kenneth (1988). Carl Faberge: Goldsmith to the Imperial Court of Russia. Gramercy. ISBN 0-517-40502-4.
