= Resurrection (Fabergé egg) =

Fabergé egg

Resurrection Fabergé egg
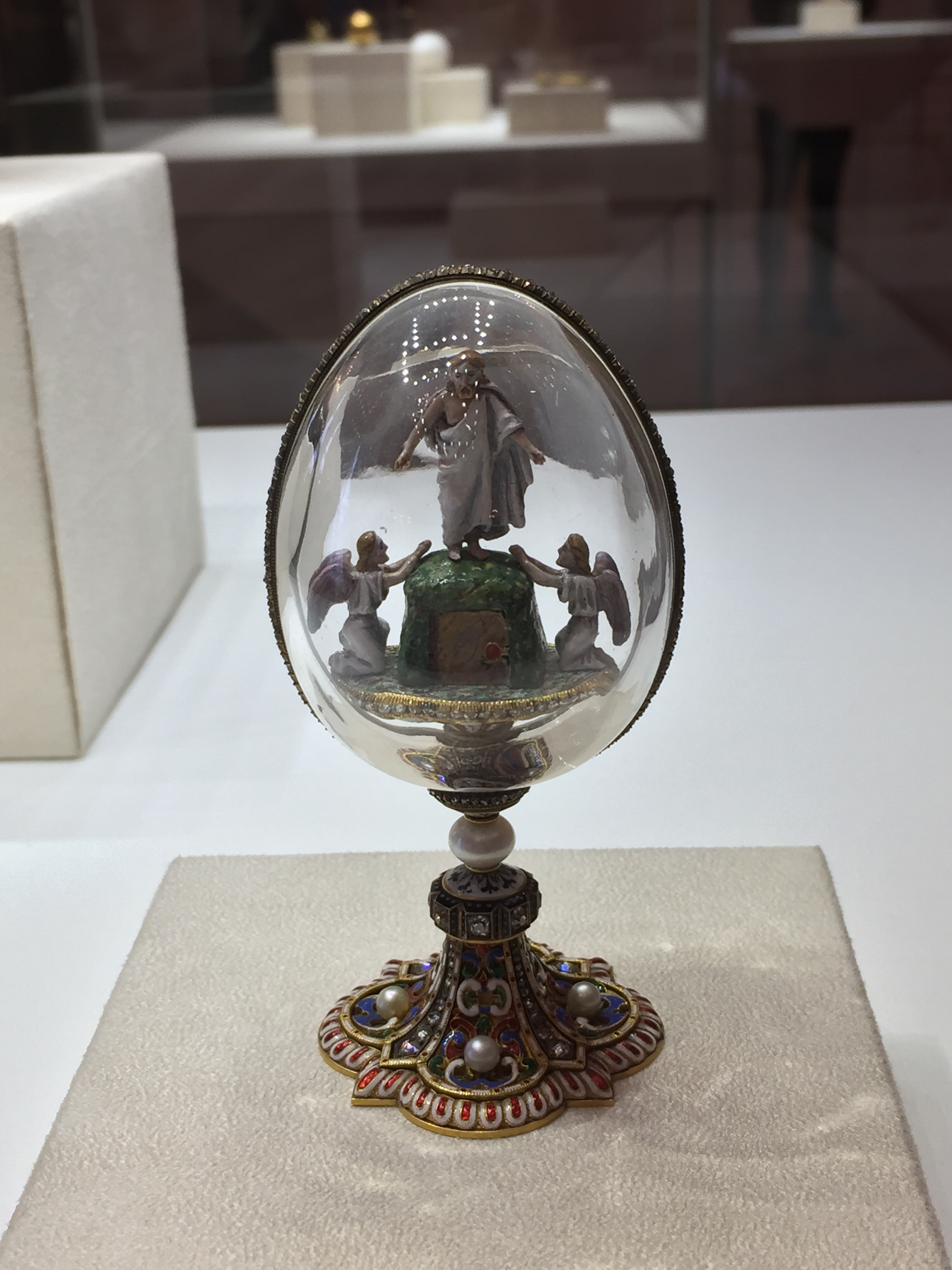
- Year delivered: 1894
- Customer: Alexander III
- Recipient: Maria Feodorovna

Current owner
- Individual or institution: Viktor Vekselberg; Fabergé Museum in Saint Petersburg, Russia
- Year of acquisition: 2004

Design and materials
- Workmaster: Michael Perkhin
- Surprise: none (possibly the surprise of the Renaissance Egg)

The Resurrection egg is a jewelled rock crystal Easter egg believed to have been made by Michael Perchin under the supervision of the Russian jeweller Peter Carl Fabergé sometime before 1899. Long considered to be a separate Fabergé egg, it has been postulated that the Resurrection egg is actually the missing surprise from the Renaissance egg.

The egg depicts Jesus rising from his tomb, and it is the only Fabergé egg to explicitly reference the Easter story.

== History ==
The Resurrection egg bears the mark of Michael Perchin and assay marks indicating that it was made in Saint Petersburg before 1899.

Long considered a Fabergé egg, and recognised as such by leading Fabergé experts, it does not bear an inventory number. It has been postulated by Christopher Forbes that the Resurrection egg is the missing surprise from the 1894 Renaissance egg, as it perfectly fits the curvature of the Renaissance egg's shell, has a similar decoration in enamel on the base, and features a pearl, which is mentioned in the invoice for the Renaissance egg but not present on that egg.

The Resurrection egg was bought in 1922 by a London art dealer, then sold at Christie's in 1934. Owned by Lord Grantchester, it was bought from his estate by Manhattan art dealers A La Vieille Russie. In 1978, A La Vieille Russie negotiated a private sale of the Resurrection egg and the First Hen Egg to the Forbes Collection.

In 2004, it was sold as part of the Forbes Collection to Viktor Vekselberg. He purchased nine Imperial Easter eggs, as part of the collection, for almost $100 million. The egg is now housed in Vekselberg's Fabergé Museum in Saint Petersburg, Russia.

== Surprise ==
There is no surprise in this egg, possibly because it is a surprise itself.

== See also ==
- Egg decorating
