= Microscripts =

2010 Short story collection by Robert Walser

- Author: Robert Walser
- Translator: Susan Bernofsky
- Language: English
- Publisher: New Directions Publishing
- Publication date: 2010
- Publication place: United States
- Media type: Print
- Pages: 160

Microscripts is a 2010 English-language collection of 25 prose pieces by the Swiss author Robert Walser that were composed in his microscript form. These manuscripts used a tiny form of abbreviated handwriting in pencil, written on re-used paper materials, that took scholars years to decipher and transcribe. The selected writings are translated from German by Susan Bernofsky.

The collection includes 1:1 scale photos of the original handwritten microscript document presented alongside the standard printed text in English. As an afterword, the book includes a 1929 essay about Walser by the famed German literary figure Walter Benjamin (1892-1940).

== Background ==
At the time of working on Microscripts, Susan Bernofsky had been translating Walser's writings for 25 years.

=== The "pencil zone" ===
"When I referred before to the concept brouillon [rough drafts or scrawlings], I was actually revealing to you an entire creative and life history [...]. This pencil system [...] has caused me real torments, but this torment taught me patience. [...] I suffered a real breakdown in my hand on account of the pen, a sort of cramp [...]. I experienced a period of disruption that was mirrored, as it were, in my handwriting and its disintegration."

— Excerpts from Walser's 1927 letter to Max Rychner

Walser wrote in a 1927 letter to Max Rychner, editor of the German-language journal Neue Schweizer Rundschau, that he experienced hand cramps when using a pen and that the problem was both physical and mental. He therefore changed to pencil and a system he compared to "a logically consistent, office-like copying system", in which he composed in pencil in a tiny script and then made fair copies afterward for submission to publication. Walser wrote that the process "has caused me real torments, but this torment taught me patience."

Susan Bernofsky notes that Walser's penmanship outside of the microscripts was flamboyantly elegant and showed the mindset of a meticulous craftsman, therefore the pen cramp problem was a serious artistic and psychological crisis in Walser's life as a writer. Walser's exceptionally good calligraphic handwriting was noted by several employers at the banks and offices where he worked as a copyist, in a time before the widespread adoption of typewriters.

=== Name ===
Walser referred to the method as Bleistiftgebiet (i.e. pencil zone), which is now referred to by scholars in English as the "pencil area" and various equivalent names. The handwritten documents are known by scholars as the microscripts or micrograms (mikrogramme in German), which was not a term used by Walser.

=== The manuscripts ===
The alphabetic characters in the microscripts range in size from about 1-2mm. They were written on re-used materials including business cards, tax documents, bills, an honorarium notice, tear-off calendars, the back of the cover of a cheap pulp book, beermats, letters of rejection, bank statements, telegrams, menus, envelopes, receipts, and corners of newspapers. Walser usually cut the materials into groups of uniform sizes. In some cases, multiple separate pieces or stories are assembled on the same piece of paper.

526 microscripts were found after Walser's death in 1956, which had been apparently unknown to close friends or anyone on record. They became the property of his sister Fanny, who cared for his literary estate. In her final years, she transferred them to the organization that later became the Robert Walser Foundation and Archive. There, they were examined and transcribed by scholars Bernhard Echte and Werner Morlang. The work took more than 10 years.

=== Timeline and secrecy ===
Although Walser wrote in the 1927 letter to Rychner that he started using the microscript technique approximately in 1917, Susan Bernofsky identifies evidence in The Tanners that he was using it, or had thought through it as an experimental process, as early as 1906. Bernofsky also points out that Walser told Rychner that Berlin was the starting place for the method, and it's known that Walser was only in Berlin from 1905 to 1913.

Carl Seelig, Walser's legal guardian in the later stages of his life, wrote that the microscripts "can only be interpreted as a fearful retreating from the public eye and a calligraphically enchanting camouflage he used to hide his thoughts from the public."

The revised timeline from Bernofsky's investigation led her to caution against the common notion that Walser's "crisis of the hand" is directly connected to his "dejected" downturn period toward the 1920's, when he returned to Switzerland in defeat from Berlin. Bernofsky raises the possibility that Walser kept the microscripts and timeline private because they might have raised the question of his mental health, including about the previous timeframe before he was acknowledged to have mental health issues, long before he was living in asylum.

=== Selection ===
The selection in Microscripts is 25 pieces, taken from among the total 2,000 pages (six final archived transcribed volumes) of microscripts at the Walser archives. The complete microscripts include poems and dramolettes (i.e. short plays or dialogues), but the Microscripts (2010) collection focusses on prose piece stories and story fragments. The selection includes microscripts that Walser himself had copied into standard writing for submission to magazines and newspapers, and pieces that remained only in microscript in his lifetime.

== Style and themes ==
Jan Stuart at The Boston Globe noted that "counterintuitively, the arduous [microscript] technique liberated the author to compose, in his own words, 'more dreamily, peacefully, cozily, contemplatively.'" Walser had written that he hoped the method would lead him to "a peculiar form of happiness," which Stuart compares to a "yogi meditating his way to cosmic consciousness." Similarly, Jacob Silverman at the Virginia Quarterly Review argued that when Walser was using the pencil method, "he was not fully himself. He was plumbing a space somewhere between automatic writing and traditional composition. It was a half-conscious effort, a way to escape his analytical self, his self-castigating mind, by tricking it into being loose."

C.D. Rose at Minor Literature described the works as:

"[...] graphite runes, asemic glyphs that Walser, madness-adjacent if not yet committed, had to keep with him, a lexical talisman, his own external memory, deciphered only post mortem then fashioned into books [...]. This is writing that is designed not to be read, but [...] to disappear, [...] perhaps with only the slightest intent of ever being fished out of the murk of history and being exposed to the merest glimmer of light."

— C.D. Rose at Minor Literature

Rivka Galchen wrote that the pieces combine the magnificently humble, the enormously small, and the meaningfully ridiculous.

Walter Benjamin's afterword, from a 1929 essay, advises the reader not to try to unravel Walser's wandering narratives or feverish metaphors but to enjoy a "fascinating linguistic wilderness." Benjamin also described Walser's style as "wreathing himself in linguistic garlands," and asserted that garland is a good image for Walser's sentences.

== Reception ==
Jan Stuart at The Boston Globe wrote in a review that the sketches are "irresistably sly." C.D. Rose at Minor Literature wrote, "the writing is, like Walser himself, 'holy and...silly' (to use Rivka Galchen’s words)." Time Out New York called the pieces "enigmatic." Rivka Galchen at Harper's praised Bernofsky's translation and described the works as similar to a Dutch still life, in that the given subject is small and domestic yet encompasses the world. Christine Smallwood at The Nation wrote that the pieces are "not small as in quotidian" but small in a mythic grand way.

Sam Sacks at The Wall Street Journal wrote, "the author insisted that ‘in trivialities lies the supernatural,’ but his fiction was the product of deep attention to his art." Sacks stated that the included works raise several questions: "It's natural to ask: Who would write like this, so liltingly, so effusively, so optimistically? Is the piece in earnest or is the credulity a put-on? And then, more anxiously, if this really is sincere, what became of such a sensibility?"

John Banville wrote at The Guardian that he received the book from a friend for Christmas, and called it "the most fascinating and most beautifully produced book I have come across in some years" and "a thing like no other." He described the deciphering work by Werner Morlang and Bernhard Echte as "a triumph of scholarly tenacity", and the book design by Christine Burgin as "a triumph of the book-maker's art."

Jacob Silverman at The Virginia Quarterly Review wrote in a review that "some [of the pieces] are pithy fictional sketches, clever pastiches, or recasting of ancient myths; others are word salads of sprinting thoughts that resemble prose poetry." He concluded that Walser is "a bighearted thinker, an innovative stylist, and a creator of winsome verbal melodies."

== Pieces included ==
Works named below with non-standard title capitalization, i.e. lowercase keywords, are works that were never titled or published in Walser's lifetime and are known by their first line.

- "Radio"
- "Swine"
- "Jaunts elegant in nature now lay in the past"
- "If I am properly informed as to her circumstances"
- "What a nice writer I ran into"
- "The Songstress"
- "The Demanding Fellow"
- "Somewhere and somewhen, in a region"
- "The Train Station" (Note: This piece is similar in perceptions and feelings to Walser's piece "Something About the Railway" collected in Berlin Stories)
- "Crisis" (Note: The piece begins by noting that the fact that children at play are merry puts the narrator in a "critical frame of mind", then explores a claim by a "Herr Zigerli" that there is a "crisis of cheerfulness" affecting society. He also sketches what appears to be a romantic affair with a woman.)
- "So here was a book again"
- "Is it perhaps my immaturity"
- "The Prodigal Son"
- "Usually I first put on a prose piece jacket" (Note: The narrator describes observing a joyful children's game of rolling beer-glass mats, which an extremely cheerful dog is accompanying. He then describes a majestically lonely woman who is at a window, gives a recollection of being paid in bread for work, and discusses the writing itself.)
- "My subject here is a victor"
- "A will to shake that refined individual" (Note: The opening line is, "A will to shake that refined individual, to rattle him about as if he were a scraggly tree bearing only isolated jittery leaves seems to be stirring within me.")
- "He numbered [...] among the good"
- "Journey to a Small Town" (Note: Includes the lines "For some time now I have intentionally [...] been neglecting so-called elegancy with regard to my manner of writing and thinking, so that it might, conserved, remain available for my use, since the finer things are particularly swift to wear out." The narrator also discusses castles and inquires anthropologically and comically about castle life. He also discusses a sturm und drang play he recently saw.)
- "The Marriage Proposal"
- "Autumn"
- "A Sort of Cleopatra"
- "On failing to prize the chance to spend time in a cosmopolitan city"
- "As I was instructed by a book"
- "Schnapps" (Note: The narrator seemingly discusses alcoholism and adds that "to get schnappsed" is a regional expression that means to receive a reprimand. Also see: Schnapps. The narration says that it contains words of warning, and among other things depicts a woman saying to a husband "cut out the boozing!")
- "New Year's Page"
