= Robert Walser =

Swiss writer (1878–1956)

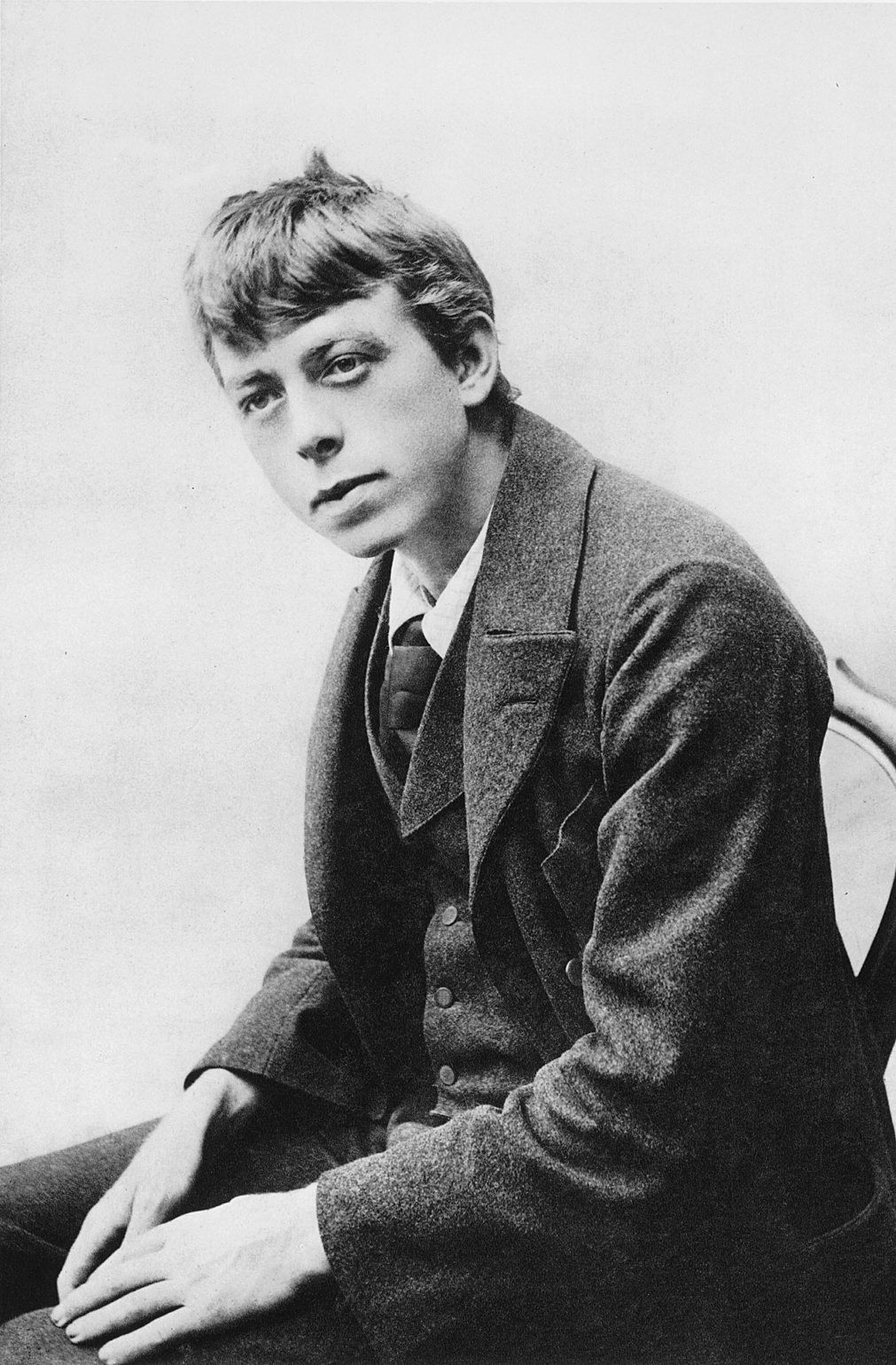
- Robert Walser around 1900
- Born: 15 April 1878; Biel/Bienne, Switzerland
- Died: 25 December 1956 (aged 78) near Herisau, Switzerland
- Occupation: Writer
- Writing career
- Movement: Modernism

Robert Walser (Swiss Standard German: [ˈvalzər]; 15 April 1878 – 25 December 1956) was a German language Swiss writer noted for writing four novels (one published posthumously) and a large number of feuilletons, short stories, and causeries. His unconventional, sometimes enigmatic works were appreciated by contemporaries such as Walter Benjamin, Hermann Hesse, Franz Kafka, Robert Musil and Kurt Tucholsky. He additionally worked as a copyist, an inventor's assistant, a butler, and in various other low-paying trades.

After marginal early success in his literary career, the popularity of his work gradually diminished through the 1920's, making it increasingly difficult for him to support himself through writing. He eventually had a nervous breakdown and spent the remainder of his life in sanatoriums. His work underwent a rediscovery in the 1970s with the deciphering of the microscripts, and a large portion of his work was first translated into and published in English in the 2000's and onward. Walser is now considered one of the important German-language authors of the 20th century and a significant figure in modernism.

== Life and work ==
=== 1878–1897 ===
Born Robert Otto Walser, he was the second-youngest of eight children of Adolf Walser (1833–1914), a trained bookbinder who owned a workshop producing stationery goods and picture frames, and his wife Elisabeth (Elisa) Walser (1839–1894). Walser grew up in Biel, Switzerland, on the language border between the German- and French-speaking regions of Switzerland, and grew up speaking both languages. He attended primary school and progymnasium, which he had to leave before the final exam when his family could no longer bear the cost. From his early years on, he was an enthusiastic theatre-goer; his favourite play was The Robbers by Friedrich Schiller. A watercolor by Karl Walser depicts Robert in costume as Karl Moor, the protagonist of that play.

In the 1880's, Walser experienced several traumatic experiences including a brother's death, his father's business collapsing, and his mother's decline into psychological illness. In 1884, Walser's brother Adolf died at age 15 after an illness, when Robert was 6. His mother became inconsolable. His father's business collapsed around this time and he lost his prestigious Nidaugasse shop location, and the family was forced to move to a worse area. Robert's mother Elise was traumatized by Adolf's death and the economic misfortune in the family business, partly because she had been deeply affected by witnessing her own mother's poverty and struggles in her childhood. She became physically weak and afraid to leave the house. Multiple works from Walser's later career depict a mother who is deeply unhappy, psychologically ill, embittered, or whose family members are cautious about setting her off, e.g. "The Merchant", "Portrait of Father", The Assistant, "Felix Scenes",

From 1892 to 1895, Walser left school to apprentice at the Bernischer Kantonalbank in Biel, as his father's business was dwindling and he wanted Robert to have a secure work and financial life unlike his own. Afterwards Robert worked for a short time in Basel. Walser's mother Elisabeth (1839–1894) had a mood disorder that was labelled in contemporary terms as gemütskrank. She died in 1894 after a prolonged illness during which she had been cared for by her elder daughter, Lisa Walser, and was either thought to have had a stroke or to be at risk of a stroke. The Swiss Germanist Peter von Matt has argued that Walser's relationship with his mother was constitutive for his literary work. Robert was 16 when his mother died, and had already left school long before this point.

In 1895, Walser went to Stuttgart where his brother Karl lived. He worked as a clerk in the advertising department of the Union Deutsche Verlagsgesellschaft and also at the Cotta publishing house. He tried unsuccessfully to become an actor, auditioning for an actress at the Stuttgart Hoftheater. Two of his later short pieces, "Wenzel" and "The Audition", portray a protagonist who attempts to be an actor but is harshly criticized by established actors judging his skill, who are thought to represent Eleonore Benzinger-Wahlman and by longstanding legend in Walser scholarship, Josef Kainz, though Kainz was never historically recorded as being in Stuttgart. Around 1896, he wrote in a letter to his sister that he wasn't going to become an actor, but a poet instead "if God so wills it." On foot, he walked approximately 140 total miles to Zurich, by way of Tübingen, Hechingen, and Schaffhausen. On September 30, 1896 he registered as a Zürich resident. In the following years, he often worked as a "Kommis", an office clerk, but irregularly and in many different places. As a result, he was one of the first Swiss writers to introduce into literature a description of the life of a salaried employee.

=== 1898–1912 ===
In 1898, the influential critic Joseph Victor Widmann published a series of poems by Walser in the Bernese newspaper Der Bund. This came to the attention of Franz Blei, and he introduced Walser to the circle of Art Nouveau figures centered on the magazine Die Insel, including Frank Wedekind, Max Dauthendey and Otto Julius Bierbaum. In 1899, several of Walser’s poems appeared in Die Insel (The Island), a four-year-old journal that had also published works by Dostoevsky and Baudelaire. The August 1 issue contained Walser, Edgar Allan Poe, and Tolstoy, among others. His first published prose work was "Lake Greifen" in 1899, which appeared in the Sunday supplement of Der Bund. "Lake Greifen" was also Walser's first work about a walk. Die Insel published several short dramas by Walser around 1902.

Music is the sweetest thing in the world. I absolutely adore notes. I'll run a thousand paces just to hear one. Often when I'm walking through the hot streets in summer and hear the sound of a piano from an unknown house, I stop in my tracks, ready to die on the spot. I'd like to die listening to a piece of music. I imagine this as so easy, so natural, but naturally it's quite impossible. Notes stab too softly. The wounds they leave behind may smart, but they don't fester. Melancholy and pain trickle out instead of blood. When the notes cease, all is peaceful again within me. Then I go to do my homework, to eat or play, and forget about it.

— Excerpt from "Music" within Fritz Kocher's Essays (1904). Translated by Susan Bernofsky

Around 1902, Walser experimented with writing in dialect in a play titled The Pond: Scenes (Der Teich. Szenen), which was not published and is the only surviving work written in his native dialect, the Bernese German variety of Swiss German spoken in Biel. It contains the line "Was isch jetz für Zit? Scho drü? Alee, pressier, pressier", which is Alemannic German for "What time is it? Already three? Come on, hurry, hurry." Much later in life, Walser told Carl Seelig that he didn't write in dialect because it was "an unseemly way of ingratiating oneself to the masses."

Until 1905, Walser lived mainly in Zürich, though he often changed lodgings and also lived for a time in Thun, Solothurn, Winterthur and Munich. In 1903, he performed recurring mandatory military service, which involved several periods of infantry training and refresher courses. In the summer, he became the "aide" of an engineer and inventor in Wädenswil near Zürich, Carl Dubler. This episode became the basis of his 1908 novel Der Gehülfe (i.e. "The Handyman," titled in English publication as The Assistant), where the main character works for an inventor "Carl Tobler." In 1904, his first book, Fritz Kochers Aufsätze (Fritz Kocher's Essays), appeared in the Insel Verlag with eleven illustrations by his brother Karl.

At the end of 1905 he attended a training school for servants, probably the school run by a G. Manthei. (Walser later described his servant project as being similar to Don Quixote’s knighthood.). He became a servant at the castle of Dambrau in Upper Silesia, partly due to his fluency in French, and entered the employ of Count Konrad von Hochberg, Baron of Fursteinstein, an extremely wealthy aristocrat. His 1917 story “Tobold” is thought to reflect some of his experiences at this time. The theme of serving would characterize his work in the following years, especially in the novel Jakob von Gunten (1909). In 1905, he went to live in Berlin, where his brother Karl Walser was already living and working as a successful theater painter. Karl introduced him to artistic social circles in Berlin, including figures in literature, publishing, and the theater. Occasionally, Walser worked as secretary for the artists' corporation Berliner Secession.

"In the Electric Tram" (1908)

"[...] Our [tram] car is constantly in motion. It is raining in the streets we glide through, and this constitutes one more added pleasantness. Some people find it frightfully agreeable to see that it is raining and at the same time be permitted to sense that they themselves are not getting wet. The image produced by a gray, wet street has something consoling and dreamy about it, and so you stand now upon the rear platform of the creaking car that is rumbling its way forward, and you gaze straight ahead. Gazing straight ahead is something done by almost all the people who sit or stand in the “electric.”

People do, after all, tend to get somewhat bored on such trips, which often require twenty or thirty minutes or even more, and what do you do to provide yourself with some modicum of entertainment? You look straight ahead. To show by one’s gaze and gestures that one is finding things a bit tedious fills a person with a quite peculiar pleasure. Now you return to studying the face of the conductor on duty, and now you content yourself once more with merely, vacantly staring straight ahead.

— Excerpts from "In the Electric Tram" (1908). Translated by Susan Bernofsky

In Berlin, Walser wrote the three novels The Tanners (Geschwister Tanner), The Assistant (Der Gehülfe) and Jakob von Gunten within a three-year period. They were issued by the publishing house of Bruno Cassirer. The Tanners had been rejected by Cassirer but Christian Morgenstern, one of Cassirer's editors, persuaded him to publish it. Apart from the novels, Walser wrote many short stories, for example sketching popular bars from the point of view of a poor "flaneur" in a very playful and subjective language. Robert Musil and Kurt Tucholsky, among others, stated their admiration for Walser's prose, and authors like Hermann Hesse and Franz Kafka counted him among their favorite writers.

Walser published numerous short stories in newspapers and magazines, many for instance in the Schaubühne. They became his trademark. The larger part of his work is composed of short stories – literary sketches that elude a ready categorization. Selections of these short stories were published in the volumes Aufsätze (1913) and Geschichten (1914).

=== 1913–1929 ===
In 1913, Walser returned to Switzerland. He lived for a short time with his sister Lisa in the mental home in Bellelay, where she worked as a teacher. He met Frieda Mermet, who worked as washer-woman there, and developed a close friendship. After a short stay with his father in Biel, he went to live in a mansard in the Biel hotel Blaues Kreuz. In 1914, his father died.

In Biel, Walser wrote a number of shorter stories that appeared in newspapers and magazines in Germany and Switzerland. Selections of which were published in Der Spaziergang (1917), Prosastücke (1917), Poetenleben (1918), Seeland (1919) and Die Rose (1925). Walser, who had always been an enthusiastic wanderer, began to take extended walks, often by night. Many of his stories from this period are narrations by a wanderer walking through unfamiliar neighborhoods or playful essays on writers and artists.

During World War I, Walser was mobilized in the Swiss military in a call that included all able-bodied men, which was about 425,000 men in the first phase. Germany invaded Belgium the day after this call-up. He participated in marches and maneuvers to strategic areas, creation of fortifications, target practice, and air attack watches at secret locations. At the end of 1916, his brother Ernst died after suffering from mental illness in the Waldau asylum. In 1919, Walser's brother Hermann, who was a successful geography professor in Bern, committed suicide. Walser himself became isolated as there was almost no communication with Germany because of the war. Furthermore, some German publishers and literary groups “patriotically” shifted focus to German authors, so Walser substantially shifted his submissions to Swiss periodicals and publishers. Inflation after WW1 in Germany also caused Walser financial problems: several of Walser’s earned payments and prize money awards in German currency became worthless and unobtainable, though these payments would have previously supported him for many months, and at least one publisher stated that they couldn’t publish one of his manuscripts for economic reasons. Paper supply shortages in the war and post-war years also affected publishers and Walser’s manuscripts. Additionally his novel Tobold was abandoned or destroyed by him after he had apparent doubts about its quality, although there is no record of disapproval or approval by the publishers who had seen excerpts. In 1919, Robert had described his situation as “in bitter financial straits”, and he requested and received early payment for Lake Country (Seeland in German) from the publisher Rascher. He could not easily support himself solely as a freelance writer and expressed an idea around 1920 to finish his writing career and change to permanent office employment or other work.

Edith loves him. More on this later. Perhaps she never should have initiated relations with this good-for-nothing who has no money. It appears she's been sending him emissaries, or - how shall we put it - ambassadresses. He has ladyfriends everywhere, but nothing ever comes of them, and what a nothing has come of this famous, as it were, hundred francs! Once, out of sheer affability, benevolence, he left one hundred thousand marks in the hands of others. Laugh at him, and he'll laugh as well. This alone might make a dubious impression.

— First lines from The Robber (~1922). Translated by Susan Bernofsky

In 1920, Walser walked to Zurich from Biel for a reading of his work for a much-needed honorarium fee, a three-day journey by foot. During rehearsal the Literary Circle decided that someone else should read Walser's work rather than himself, apparently because of discrimination against his Swiss accent or reading style. In "A Letter to Therese Breitbach" (Note: This prose piece is collected in Selected Stories (Robert Walser short story collection)) (1925), Walser quoted them as saying he "had still not learned to speak German." One of the organizers, Hans Trog, served as substitute reader and told the audience that Walser was ill and couldn’t attend, knowing that Walser was in fact sitting in the audience unrecognized by the attendees. Eduardo Korrodi described a different reading by Walser in 1922 “very idiosyncratic, certainly not orthodox, handling some parts oddly, others excellently.” Walser stated in a letter that he had frequently been drinking alcohol during the later event.

In December 1920, Walser’s sister Fanny, and his brother Herman’s acquaintance with council member Alfred Rudolph, helped him get a temporary position at the State Archive of the Canton of Bern, offered by head archivist Gottlieb Kurz. In January 1921 He moved to Bern and began his role as assistant archivist. His return to Bern and job at the archive are briefly described in the prose piece “Latest News”, published in 1921. He often changed lodgings and lived a very solitary life.

While in Bern, Walser's style became more radical. In the words of Susan Bernofsky, “In Bern he truly came into his own and developed the stylistic and narrative approaches that would define his legacy as a writer. But this artistic growth took place during a period of increasing isolation and unease.” In Walser’s words, as told to Carl Seelig, “I began to write less like a shepherd boy; my writing became more manly and international.” He wrote the radically digressive novel The Robber (Die Räuber) in microscript form around 1922, which is far more stylistically complex than Walser's earlier works. The posthumously published printed version is about 150 pages, but the microscript manuscript was about 24 pages of tiny handwriting. He continued writing poems, short prose, and dramolettes. In this stage of his career, his playful, subjective style moved toward a higher abstraction. Many texts of this time are feigned-naive playful feuilletons that are highly complex montages full of allusions. Walser also absorbed influences from serious literature as well as from formula fiction. For example, in some prose pieces, he wrote condensed satires or revisionings of dime novel plots, or wrote review-like explorations of them. Examples of these are "The Red Leather Pouch" (an espionage plot), "Detective Novel", "Ghosts", "ludwig", and "A Woman's Book" (which are collected in Girlfriends, Ghosts, and Other Stories).

=== 1929–1956 ===
In the beginning of 1929, Walser had a mental breakdown and went to the Bernese mental home Waldau on the urging of his sister Lisa. He had previously experienced anxiety and hallucinations. His medical records state "The patient confessed hearing voices." He was eventually diagnosed with catatonic schizophrenia. While he was in the mental home, his state of mind quickly returned to normal, and he went on writing and publishing. Walser made increasing use of what he called his "pencil method" (Bleistiftmethode), a two-stage compositional process he had reportedly developed as early as 1917. Working drafts of poems, prose pieces, dramatic scenes and even an entire novel (The Robber) were first written in pencil in a minuscule Kurrent hand, the so-called "microscripts" (Mikrogramme). The letters measured 1-2 millimeters in height. In a second working stage, Walser selected from these drafts and copied them out in ink as fair copies, often editing in the process, before submitting them to editors for publication. Only a portion of the microscript drafts were ever transferred into fair copies; comparatively few drafts survive from the Waldau years, with more fair copies and published texts extant from that period. The microscripts were long thought to be written in a private code. (See Rediscovery and Microscripts below.)

Nature isn’t always good; no, often she’s enraged, and each time there are valid scientific reasons for this.

How lovely spring is, and in winter a charming, snowbound, pretty little village.

On the other hand, a mountain, from whose interior an unannounced fire erupts, makes us tremble. A river of liquid embers pours down into the valley, clearing a way for itself, consuming everything in its path, through gardens and cultivated fields. One thinks here of Pompeii.

Then one imagines an earthquake that, with a speed defying comprehension, breaks apart churches, rends the houses asunder, and draws cracks in the earth, so that when seen by the people of the region, they feel induced to flee.

— Excerpt from "Mother Nature" (1933). Translated by Tom Whalen

In 1933, Walser was transferred against his will to the sanatorium of Herisau in his home canton of Appenzell Ausserrhoden, and he stopped writing. His abandonement of writing was arguably shaped not only by the forced move but also by the Nazi seizure of power in Germany, which eliminated a substantial portion of the German-language newspaper and journal market in which Walser's short prose had appeared throughout the 1920s. The director of the Herisau institution, Dr. Otto Hinrichsen — himself a writer — reportedly offered Walser a room set aside for literary work, but Walser did not take the offer. Like the other patients, he was occupied with making paper bags and with cleaning duties, and in his free time read popular fiction. In 1934, again against his will, he was placed under legal guardianship.

In 1936, his admirer Carl Seelig began to visit him. He later wrote a book, Wanderungen mit Robert Walser, about their talks. In reply to Carl Seelig asking about a return to writing, Walser famously said, "I am not here to write, but to be mad." Seelig tried to revive interest in Walser's work by re-issuing some of his writings. After the death of Walser's brother Karl in 1943 and of his sister Lisa in 1944, Seelig became Walser's legal guardian. Though free of outward signs of mental illness for a long time, Walser was irritable and repeatedly refused to leave the sanatorium.

In 1955, Walser's novella The Walk (Der Spaziergang) was undergoing translation into English by the poet and scholar Christopher Middleton; it was the first English translation of his writing and the only one that would appear during his lifetime. Upon learning of Middleton's translation from Seelig, Walser, who had fallen out of the public eye, responded with a German equivalent of "My, my" or "Well, look at that."

Walser enjoyed long walks alone. On 25 December 1956 he was found, dead of a heart attack, in a field of snow near the asylum. The photographs of the dead Walser in the snow are reminiscent of a similar image of a dead man in the snow in his first novel, Geschwister Tanner.

=== Family summary ===
In 1884, when Walser was 6, his brother Adolf died at age 15 after an illness. In the 1880's, his father's business also collapsed after having previously been a successful shopowner and merchant. The two stresses are thought to have partly caused his mother's debilitating psychiatric illness. She died in 1894 when Walser was 16. In 1916, Walser's brother Ernst died after suffering mental illness in the Waldau asylum. In 1919, Walser's brother Hermann, who was a successful geography professor in Bern, committed suicide.

His brother Karl Walser became a well-known stage designer and painter. His elder sister Lisa worked as a teacher and was the family's principal caregiver. Walser's younger sister Fanny (Fani) Hegi-Walser received his literary estate after his death, and in 1967 transferred it to the Carl Seelig Foundation with the stipulation that it remain accessible for science and research.

=== Walking ===
Walser was a prolific walker. For example, in 1920, he walked more than seventy miles on foot from Biel to Zurich, which was a three-day trek, for a literary reading. In 1924, he walked about 90 miles from Berne to Geneva. In Bern on weekends, he often walked trips of 7-12 miles, and wrote in a prose piece about a 36 mile journey by foot to Thun and back. He walked 40-mile round trips to several military inspections. He visited the home of Hermann Hubacher, a sculptor and friend of Karl, after a 25 mile walk. He wrote in a letter to Frieda Mermet that he had walked the 90 miles from Bern to Geneva in a mere thirty hours. On periodic visits to Frieda in Bellelay, Walser walked about 50 miles via the Weissenstein ridge, Solothurn, and Bern, a journey. While in Stuttgart, he frequently took 5 mile walks from the city to the nearby countryside. The main character in The Robber is described to have “paced out on foot” the “length and breadth” of Rügen island, which Walser is known to have visited on a trip in 1911.

Around the 1920's, Susan Bernofsky believes Walser walked to exertion as a kind of therapy and to "get the better of agitation." A group of pedestrians including Emil Wiedmer who were on the Verena Gorge Hermitage woodland trails were passed by Walser and reported that in a “strangely sinister” way he moved through them without a single glance or word, “the back of his neck and face bright red, and the heavy military shoes thick with dust. In short, the picture of a walker who must have been on the move for hours.”

Many of Walser's stories depict a walk, including The Walk, his first published prose piece "Lake Greifen", "Ascent by Night" (1914), "Walking", “The Literary Evening” (1921), “News Three” (1921), and "The Moon." "The White Lady" mentions a walk that took twenty hours.

== Reception ==
Today, Walser's texts, completely re-edited since the 1970s, are regarded as among the most important writings of literary modernism and German-language literature. Susan Sontag has said that "Walser's virtues are those of the most mature, most civilized art. He is truly a wonderful, heartbreaking writer." W.G. Sebald said that Walser "illumined every page with the most genial light."

Scholar Michael Andre Bernstein has written:

He is a much more interesting writer than one might guess from [typical anecdotes about] his legend, and his quirky power as a storyteller, the elusive interplay between the hopelessly--even abjectly--naive and the sardonically disenchanted, is utterly singular to him. [His work has a] mixture of passionate identification and subversive mockery at its most unsettling. [...]

Walser's indifference to the literary assumptions and strategies that even the most experimental of his great contemporaries accepted helped him to attain something just as elusive and difficult as their modernist masterpieces: a body of work whose utter strangeness and originality, of purpose and of design, sounds like no one but him. A single page of Walser, taken from anywhere in his work, is instantly recognizable as his. And that, surely, is the one reliable sign of a writer who continues to matter.

Reviews at The Guardian have called Walser's short works "unbelievably delightful and timeless" and stated that "there is no one like Walser. Utterly original, he expressed thoughts that no other writer would, except when in the blackest of moods – but Walser expressed them in an extraordinarily sunny way." Boston Globe reviews have called Walser's short sketches "irresistibly sly" and described his work as "humming with well-considered ruminations on his surroundings" and "apparently serene portraits of quotidian moments that often mask existential quandaries." Joe Winkler at Vol. 1 Brooklyn called Walser's short works "manipulative and delightfully ambiguous."

Will Stone in a review at the Times Literary Supplement wrote that Walser's texts "fizz with mischievousness, panache, feverish energy, and archaic eloquence." Stone described Walser's perceptions as "insightful, capricious and daring, wayward and unpredictable, at times endearingly comical."

Y. Greyman at Open Letters Monthly called a set of Walser's short pieces poignant and witty, and praised Walser's talent for "investing meaning into the small, the repetitive, the quotidian. [...] it only takes Walser a sentence or two to place in you in his sweet, tragicomical world." Nora Rawn at KGB Bar Lit wrote, "to read Walser is to fall under the enchantment of a particularly open and youthful enthusiasm."

A New Yorker review stated that "it is always the quality of mind that holds us rapt" across many different unexpected subjects. Similarly, a review in Book Forum stated that Walser's "eccentric enthusiasm provides a sense of cohesion and holds the reader's attention, even [when his] narratives [are] erratic. This [...] is why he can slip from irrational exuberance to depressive defeat, and remarkably [slip between styles], without apology, explanation, or even transition." Julian Murphy at The Millions praised the "beauty [Walser] locates in the quotidian, [...] the [...] spiritual appreciation he exhibits for nature, [...] self-referentiality, brazen authorial internections, and the familiarity he exhibits with the reader. [...] It feels like peering into a mind of fantastic imagination."

Time Magazine wrote that Selected Stories "conveys a sensibility that was well ahead of its time."

=== Reception in his own time ===
In his own time, Walser was admired by several writers who were influential at the time or became so later, including Franz Kafka, Hermann Hesse, Robert Musil, Christian Morgenstern, Walter Benjamin, Max Brod, Stefan Zweig, Alfred Polgar, and Franz Blei. His works were usually well-received by critics, although his books did not succeed with a wide popular audience. Susan Bernofsky argues that Walser's books were "too quirky, too seemingly modest, too Swiss" for the popular readership at the time, and that Walser "doomed his own career by remaining faithful to [publisher] Cassirer."

Walser was one of Franz Kafka's favorites. Kafka also read Walser's work out loud while laughing hysterically, and specifically sought out Walser's feuilletons. Walser was better known during his lifetime than Kafka or Walter Benjamin were known in theirs. Walter Benjamin was an admirer and praised Walser's work in a 1929 essay.

Hermann Hesse was an admirer and said during the height of World War I that "If [Walser] had a hundred thousand readers, the world would be a better place." Hesse also wrote a rave review of Walser's 1909 novel Jakob von Gunten in which he specifically praised each of Walser's books chronologically. Hesse described a "charming stylistic surefootedness," "furtive circling of the dark spots within his own nature" (which Hesse compared to Knut Hamsun), a special ability to capture people and landscapes, and called Walser an important and wrongly overlooked writer.

Christian Morgenstern, an editor for publisher Bruno Cassirer, believed that Walser was a diamond in the rough and could become a key voice of the age. After Cassirer had rejected The Tanners, Morgenstern convinced him to publish it. Morgenstern believed the book had "passages of genuine holiness" and that Walser could become societally important for youth and "one of the most powerful voices calling us to freedom." Similarly, critic Joachim Benn, who had harshly criticized Thomas Mann's Death in Venice, wrote that Walser was "one of the few new creative voices of the age" and was as definitive to the era as Goethe and sturm und drang.

Robert Musil wrote in a 1914 essay that a person could become infatuated with the "very human kind of playfulness" and "extraordinary verbal command" in Walser's work. Musil noted that because Walser was one-of-a-kind and couldn't be imitated, his work wouldn't create a new genre.

Poet's Life (1917) was given accolades in 18 articles in 1917. A Walser anthology Grosse kleine Welt (Big Little World) in 1937 was called "a masterpiece of German prose" by Alfred Polgar and "flawless prose-gems, each as self-contained and pure as a poem" by Stefan Zweig.

A 1904 reviewer of Fritz Kocher's Essays praised "revelations--both delicate and filled with life--of an incredibly fine-turned sensibility that responds to every stimulus", and wrote that it brought artful irony to "the poetry of pathos." However, reviewers often missed or overlooked the irony. A 1908 review of The Assistant in the Times Literary Supplement was positive.

=== Poetry ===
Walser's early poems were well-received in publication in Walser's time, but Christopher Middleton, a well-known translator and popularizer of Walser's prose has said that Walser's poems have "insipid" rhymes, "perfunctory character," and "trite" sound play. Ryan Ruby argues that Middleton was "embarrassed" by some of Walser's poems that he translated. Susan Bernofsky has stated that "If such poetry was all Robert Walser ever wrote, he'd be forgotten." However, Ryan Ruby has argued that Walser's physical manuscripts of poetry, rather than in print, shows that Walser was similar to the futurists, dadaists, Hugo Ball, and Raoul Hausmann, and was a forerunner of the experimental poets Robert Grenier, Susan Howe, and Anne Waldman. In Ruby's words, these connections are where Walser's "unacknowledged significance for the [...] history of poetry" lies, rather than in the short lyrics.

Franz Blei, an author and journal editor, solicited and supported Walser's poems. Based on meeting Walser and reading his poems, he wrote that "he will achieve extraordinary things." Walser's were the only poems mentioned in Blei's 200-page diary. Otto Hinrichsen, who reviewed one of Walser's short plays in print, and who had apparently previously had a personal conflict with Walser, criticized the play while conceding that the author had a gift for poetry (in other publications). Hermann Hesse dismissed Walser's poetry in an article that was otherwise a rave review of all of his published prose works.

== Rediscovery ==
=== In the German-speaking world ===
After around 1925, Walser was rapidly forgotten. Carl Seelig published several editions of Walser’s work, which appeared almost exclusively in Switzerland and received little attention. A revival of interest in his work arose in the 1970s and 1980s when his writings from "the Pencil Zone" (sometimes known as the "pencil area"), or in Walser's words the Bleistiftgebiet, began to be deciphered and published in German. These were manuscripts (often called microscripts in English) written in an abbreviation-coded, microscopically tiny hand using a form of Kurrent script on scraps of paper collected while in a Waldau sanatorium.

In 1972, Jochen Greven and Martin Jürgens had deciphered and published The Robber, an entire novel that Walser had written in microscript, and the Felix scenes from the same body of drafts. The rest of the microscripts were eventually deciphered between 1985 and 2000 by Werner Morlang and Bernhard Echte. They published the texts in the six-volume edition Aus dem Bleistiftgebiet ("From the Pencil Zone").

Since then, almost all his writings have become accessible through an extensive republication of his entire body of work.

=== In the English-speaking world ===
The 1957 English-language publication of Christopher Middleton's translation of The Walk and Other Stories is considered a key event in recognition of Walser as a significant figure of literary modernism, not only in English-language awareness but also in Swiss and German-language scholarship as Walser had been largely forgotten in the World War II era. It was the first translation of Walser. The first English-language dissertation on Walser was defended in 1959, by George Avery, which was before the first German-language dissertation by Walser expert Jochen Greven.

In the 1960's, several journals published English-language translations of Walser's work including Barataria, Chowder Review, Lowlands Review, The Paris Review, Writ, Delos, and Texas Quarterly, and 0 to 9 magazine which published Kleist in Thun in 1967. Many of these examples were translated by Tom Whalen and collaborators, and one by Harriet Watts. Middleton's translation of Jakob von Gunten was published in 1969.

In 1982, the English-language publication of Selected Stories created a "new phase" of interest about Walser in the English-speaking world and placed him within broader international attention. The reasons were that Farrar, Straus, and Giroux was a much larger publisher than Walser's previous English-language publisher Calder Publishing, and the foreword was written by the renowned public intellectual Susan Sontag. Sontag's introduction contains influential phrasings and analysis that is often quoted in media coverage of Walser. Mark Harman's review in 1983 mentions recent coverage about Walser in Vogue, Time Magazine, and Newsweek.

The bulk of translations and publication of Walser in English occurred in the early 2000's and 2010's, including the three remaining novels that hadn't yet appeared in English (The Tanners, The Assistant, and The Robber), six volumes of prose pieces, and multiple volumes of poetry. (See list of English translations below.)

Simon Wortham asserts that although Walser's revival has rested on a "critical canon" of commonly repeated famous names (Kafka, Benjamin, Sontag, Coetzee, etc), the "reassessment of his importance is due to rigorous and patient scholarship [of] a number of academics and translators" over a few decades, especially Susan Bernofsky.

Noted translators have written essays about the unique issues in translating Walser, including Christopher Middleton's "Translation as a Species of Mime" and Susan Bernofsky's "Elements of Style in Walser's Late Prose."

== Format and genre ==
Aside from his novels and poems, Walser himself called most of his short works "prose pieces." These include a mixture of fiction, historical fiction, non-fictional explorations of specific real subjects, memoir-like musings, "literary snapshots" of urban, social, and natural spaces, and "hybrids of story and essay." In the words of scholar and translator Susan Bernofsky, Walser's short works are a mixture of fictional story, non-fictional essay, personal musings, sketches, reports, and "walks through landscapes and dreamscapes."

Walser has also been called a "causeur" and a flâneur. Susan Bernofsky and Ryan Ruby have rejected the flâneur label, which implies idleness, and instead placed Walser in a tradition of highly active Swiss walkers. In Bernofsky's words, "unlike a flâneur moving through a city at a leisurely pace, obsessively noting and recording experiences in granular detail, Walser was a speedy walker devoted to swift apperception and glimpses following one another quickly." In Ruby's words, Walser's prolific travel by foot, including through mountainous elevation, "owes more to the tradition of Swiss Wandern than French psychogeography."

J.M. Coetzee named Walser as fundamentally an essayist. Walser has also been described as an observer and perceiver of tiny details of everyday life. Scholar George C. Avery wrote that Walser's style is a "characteristically modern combination of essayism and lyricism."

Walter Benjamin used the category "satirical gloss" (gloss meaning sketch) for some of Walser's work, and wrote that he took the form to a higher level than many other practitioners (who Benjamin described as "hacks"). The satirical gloss is a recognized literary form in German, and Karl Kraus is a noted author in the form.

=== Feuilletons ===
Many of Walser's short pieces were published in his lifetime as feuilletons, which refers to the physical type of publication in a newspaper and also refers to the far-ranging sketch-like style that is otherwise uncategorizable. In the words of Christopher Middleton, feuilletons are "miniature impressions, gossipings, entertainments, anecdotes, parables, often with a lyrical twist." Scholar S. Frederick described the feuilleton form as "circular poetics of the periphery" combined with "orality as a driving force."

Mark Harman writes that Walser's feuilletons are more like parodies of feuilletons. Translator Tom Whalen argues that Walser's feuilletons are usually not parodies but an idiosyncratic use of style and subject matter unique to him. Translator Whalen notes that Walser's feuilletons differed from common feuilletons based on two facts aside from the idiosyncratic style: Kafka specifically searched out Walser's feuilletons, and a newspaper editor at Neue Zürcher Zeitung received disgruntled reader complaints about Walser's specifically.

Walser described watercolor painters as feuilletonists of the visual arts, and spoke admiringly of them.

=== Microscripts ===
Walser called his manuscripts written in tiny pencil handwriting his "Bleistiftgebiet" ("pencil zone"). Scholarly literature also refers to these texts as the microscripts due the tiny size of the writing, which was not a term used by Walser, and by various other terms including the "pencil area", "pencil zone", "B texts", pencil territory, and micrograms (mikogrammes in German scholarship).

Microscripts is also the name of a 2010 English-language collection of 25 selected microscripts.

==== Physiological background ====
Walser wrote in a 1927 letter to Max Rychner, editor of the German-language journal Neue Schweizer Rundschau (New Swiss Review), that he experienced hand cramps when using a pen and that the problem was both physical and mental. He therefore changed to pencil and a system he compared to "a logically consistent, office-like copying system", in which he composed in pencil in a tiny script and then made fair copies afterward for submission to publication. Walser wrote that the process "has caused me real torments, but this torment taught me patience."

Susan Bernofsky notes that Walser's penmanship outside of the microscripts was flamboyantly elegant and showed the mindset of a meticulous craftsman, therefore the pen cramp problem was a serious artistic and psychological crisis in Walser's life as a writer. Walser's exceptionally good calligraphic handwriting was noted by several employers at the banks and offices where he worked as a copyist, in a time before the widespread adoption of typewriters. Because transcribing fair copies in pen didn't cause the same problem for Walser as composing in pen, Bernofsky argues that the pen may have "summoned" an inner critic or represented a "long [...] daunting calligraphic history" while the pencil felt carefree, low-impact, and experimental.

Around 1918-1919, at least four publishers noted difficulties reading and using Walser's handwritten manuscripts, including cases of lines spaced too closely together for the typesetter to easily read, and writing that was too small. Part of the problem may be attributable to paper shortages, extreme inflation, and financial hardship, during and after World War I, when Walser didn't want to waste blank space on a page.

==== Media details and preservation history ====
The alphabetic characters in the microscripts range in size from about 1-2mm. They were written on re-used materials including business cards, tax documents, bills, an honorarium notice, tear-off calendars, the back of the cover of a cheap pulp book, beermats, letters of rejection, bank statements, telegrams, menus, envelopes, receipts, and corners of newspapers. Walser usually cut the materials into groups of uniform sizes. In some cases, multiple separate pieces or stories are assembled on the same piece of paper.

526 microscripts were found after Walser's death in 1956, which had been apparently unknown to close friends or anyone on record. They became the property of his sister Fanny, who cared for his literary estate. In her final years, she transferred them to the organization that later became the Robert Walser Foundation and Archive. There, they were examined and transcribed by scholars Bernhard Echte and Werner Morlang. The work took more than 10 years. The transcribed texts fill 2,000 pages across 6 archival volumes, which were compiled as Aus dem Bleistiftgebiet (i.e. From the Pencil Region) 1-6 in 1985–2000.

==== Timeline and secrecy ====
Although Walser wrote in the 1927 letter to Rychner that he started using the microscript technique approximately in 1917, Susan Bernofsky identifies evidence in The Tanners that he was using it, or had thought through it as an experimental process, as early as 1906. Bernofsky also points out that Walser told Rychner that Berlin was the starting place for the method, and it's known that Walser was only in Berlin from 1905 to 1913.

Carl Seelig, Walser's legal guardian in the later stages of his life, believed that the microscripts "can only be interpreted as a fearful retreating from the public eye and a calligraphically enchanting camouflage he used to hide his thoughts from the public."

The revised timeline from Bernofsky's investigation led her to caution against the common notion that Walser's "crisis of the hand" is directly connected to his "dejected" downturn period toward the 1920's, when he returned to Switzerland in defeat from Berlin. Bernofsky raises the possibility that Walser kept the microscripts and timeline private because they might have raised the question of his mental health, including about the previous timeframe before he was acknowledged to have mental health issues, long before he was living in asylum.

== Style and Themes ==
Susan Sontag has written that Walser's work is "charged with compassion: awareness of the creatureliness of life, of the fellowship of sadness" and that the "moral core of Walser's art is the refusal of power; of domination." Sontag has also described it as "portraits of consciousness walking about in the world, enjoying its 'morsel of life,' radiant with despair." She also called Walser a "Paul Klee in prose." W.G. Sebald wrote, "Walser accrues insights into his [...] state of mind and the nature of mental disturbance [in a way that is] found nowhere else in literature. With seismographic precision he registers the slightest tremors at the edges of his consciousness, records rejections and ripples in his thoughts and emotions."

In his writing, he made use of elements of Swiss German in a charming and original manner, while very personal observations are interwoven with texts about texts, including commentary on his own writing of the given piece at hand. His writing often includes contemplations and variations of other literary and art works, in which Walser often mixes pulp fiction with high literature.

Walser has been described as having a gift for comedy mingling with darker currents and is noted for digressions, abrupt shifts of apparent intention, and shifts of dramatic register. J.M. Coetzee has written that Walser's "charm lies in [...] surprising twists and turns of direction, delicately ironic handling of the formulas of amatory play, and supple and inventive exploitation of the resources of German." Josef Schmidt in the International Fiction Review called Walser a "causeur par excellence" and noted that he treats readers to unique word usages, creations, and hapax legomenon.

William H. Gass has written that many of Walser's pieces are short, reflective, and "deceptively ordinary in their observations." Gass described: "his transitions are abrupt as table edges; non sequiturs flock his pages like [birds]; the pieces turn, often savagely, against themselves, or they dwindle away in apparent weariness and cease for wants of a reason for going on." Noting Walser's "stroller's psychology", Gass wrote, "to his heart, everything is fresh and astonishing."

Walter Benjamin described Walser's style as "wreathing himself in linguistic garlands," and asserted that garland is a good image for Walser's sentences.

Benjamin Kunkel has stated that Walser "fulfills the modern criterion: he sounds like nobody else." He described Walser's tone as "hovering between beatific quietism and a burlesque of conventionality". Kunkel stated that Walser's combines "perfect assurance and perfect ambiguity." He observed that Walser seems to never express a non-appreciative opinion about a certain set of things including food, drink, weather, clothing, architecture, and cigars.

=== Artistic relations to other writers ===
==== Ulrich Braker ====
Walser has been said to share a literary and stylistic commonality with the Swiss writer Ulrich Braker (1735-1798). Walser gave a copy of Braker's book The Poor Man of Toggenburg (1789) to Frieda Mermet and said it was full of Lebensweisheit (i.e. or pearls of everyday wisdom).

==== Kleist, Walser, and Kafka connection ====
Christopher Benfey has identified the Kleist - Walser - Kafka connection as an "outlaw tradition running alongside, and frequently in resistance to, the 'official' German progression from Goethe and Schiller to Rilke and Mann." Critic Robert Rubsam argues that Kleist's work in the book Anecdotes has the humor and ironic wit that was later extended by "acolytes" Kafka and Walser into "an entire style."

Susan Sontag argued that Walser is the missing link between Kleist and Kafka. In Sontag's words, "at the time [of Walser's active literary career], it was more likely to be Kafka [who was understood] through the prism of Walser." Robert Musil in 1914 referred to Kafka's new book at the time as "a peculiar case of the Walser type." Kafka was known to admire Walser's work. For example, he owned Jakob von Gunten and called it good, told his co-worker Director Eisner to buy Walser's The Tanners, and Max Brod reported that Walser's short piece "Mountain Halls" was one of Franz Kafka's favorites and that Kafka would laugh hysterically when reading it aloud. Walser wrote a famous short story, "Kleist in Thun", in which he relates with aspects of a fictionalized imagining of Kleist. Kafka considered Kleist one of his "true blood-relations" in art.

An arguable sequential connection between Kleist, Walser, and Kafka has been called an "uncommonly neat pattern of influence" by Chris Power.

== Legacy and Influence ==
Aside from Kafka, Hesse, Walter Benjamin, Robert Musil, Max Brod, and Christian Morgenstern in his own time, a number of later artists and writers have expressed admiration for Walser and his work including Christopher Middleton, Thomas Bernhard, Werner Herzog, William H. Gass, Susan Sontag, Martin Walser (no relation), Max Frisch, Giorgio Agamben, Ben Lerner, Rivka Galchen, Benjamin Kunkel, Claudia Hernandez, and Holly Tavel.

He has exerted a considerable influence on various contemporary German writers, including Ror Wolf, Peter Handke, W. G. Sebald, who has expressed a kinship that connects him to Walser, and Max Goldt.

In 2004, Spanish writer Enrique Vila-Matas published a novel entitled Doctor Pasavento about Walser, his stay on Herisau and the wish to disappear. In 2007, Serbian writer Vojislav V. Jovanović published a book of prose named Story for Robert Walser inspired by the life and work of Robert Walser. In 2012, A Little Ramble: In the Spirit of Robert Walser, a series of artistic responses to Walser's work was published, including work by Moyra Davey, Thomas Schütte, Tacita Dean and Mark Wallinger.

=== In the visual arts ===
Walser has been cited as an influence by various visual artists, including Thomas Hirschhorn, who said "He was interested in little things and treated every element with equal relevance." Tom Whalen has suggested about the connection: "An image, a rhythm, a setting, a philosophical conundrum—I imagine anything out of Walser might make one reach for a brush and palette. A sense of kinship can also be a prime mover. It's easy to like a writer who reminds us simultaneously of our insignificance and the importance of the same."

=== Robert Walser Center ===
The Robert Walser Center was officially established in Bern, Switzerland in 2009. It is dedicated to the lives and work of Robert Walser and Carl Seelig, who was Walser's first patron and whose estate had created the first Robert Walser Archive on the wishes of Robert's sister Fanny around 1967. The Center's purpose is to promulgate Walser's life and work and facilitate scholarly research. It is open to both experts and the general public and includes an extensive archive, a research library, exhibition space, and two rooms with several workstations are also available. The translation of Walser's works is a key focus. The Center also develops exhibitions, events, conferences, workshops, and publications. To meet its objectives and responsibilities as an institution, it often collaborates on projects with local, national, and international partners as well as universities, schools, theaters, museums, archives, translators, editors, and publishers.

== Works ==
=== German ===
- Der Teich (The Pond), 1902, verse drama
- Schneewittchen, 1901, verse drama
- Fritz Kochers Aufsätze (Fritz Kocher's Essays), 1904 ISBN 3-518-37601-2
- Geschwister Tanner (The Tanner Children, meaning family siblings), 1907 ISBN 3-518-39982-9
- Der Gehülfe (The Handyman or factotum), 1908 ISBN 3-518-37610-1
- Poetenleben (A Poet's Life), 1908 ISBN 3-518-01986-4
- Jakob von Gunten, 1909 ISBN 3-518-37611-X
- Gedichte (Poems), 1909
- Aufsätze (Essays), 1913
- Geschichten (Stories), 1914
- Kleine Dichtungen, 1915 ISBN 3-518-37604-7
- Prosastücke, 1917
- Der Spaziergang (The Walk), 1917 ISBN 3-518-37605-5
- Kleine Prosa (Short Prose), 1917
- Poetenleben (A Poet's Life), 1917 ISBN 3-518-01986-4
- Tobold, 1918. A novel whose manuscript was either destroyed or abandoned by Walser, after he had given samples to publishers and in one case (Der Neue Merkur and Efraim Frisch) had requested that the excerpt not be published.
- Komödie, 1919
- Seeland (Lake Country or Lake Land), 1920 ISBN 3-518-37607-1
- Theodor, 1921. A novel that was not published and whose manuscript doesn't survive.
- Die Rose (The Rose), 1925 ISBN 3-518-37608-X
- Der Räuber, 1925 (published 1978) ISBN 3-518-37612-8
- Felix-Szenen, 1925
- Große Welt, kleine Welt, 1937
- Dichterbildnisse, 1947
- Dichtungen in Prosa, 1953

==== Posthumous publications, collections, and editions from the Robert Walser Archives ====
- Robert Walser – Briefe, 1979
- Sämtliche Werke in Einzelausgaben. 20 Bde. Hg. v. Jochen Greven. Zürich, Frankfurt am Main: Suhrkamp Verlag 1985-1986
- Geschichten, 1985 ISBN 3-518-37602-0
- Der Spaziergang. Prosastücke und Kleine Prosa., 1985 ISBN 3-518-37605-5
- Aufsätze, 1985 ISBN 3-518-37603-9
- Bedenkliche Geschichten. Prosa aus der Berliner Zeit 1906–1912, 1985 ISBN 3-518-37615-2
- Träumen. Prosa aus der Bieler Zeit 1913–1920, 1985 ISBN 3-518-37616-0
- Die Gedichte, 1986 ISBN 3-518-37613-6
- Komödie. Märchenspiele und szenische Dichtung, 1986 ISBN 3-518-37614-4
- Prose from the Berne period in four volumes:
  - Wenn Schwache sich für stark halten. Prosa aus der Berner Zeit 1921–1925, 1986 ISBN 3-518-37617-9
  - Zarte Zeilen. Prosa aus der Berner Zeit 1926, 1986 ISBN 3-518-37618-7
  - Es war einmal. Prosa aus der Berner Zeit 1927–1928, 1986 ISBN 3-518-37619-5
  - Für die Katz. Prosa aus der Berner Zeit 1928–1933, 1986 ISBN 3-518-37620-9
- The microscripts or micrograms, also known as the "pencil zone" ("Bleistiftgebiet"), compiled in 6 transcribed volumes:
  - Aus dem Bleistiftgebiet Band 1. Mikrogramme 1924/25. Hg. v. Bernhard Echte u. Werner Morlang i. A. des Robert Walser-Archivs der Carl Seelig-Stiftung, Zürich. Frankfurt am Main: Suhrkamp Verlag 1985–2000 ISBN 3-518-03234-8
  - Aus dem Bleistiftgebiet Band 2. Mikrogramme 1924/25. Hg. v. Bernhard Echte u. Werner Morlang i. A. des Robert Walser-Archivs der Carl Seelig-Stiftung, Zürich. Frankfurt am Main: Suhrkamp Verlag 1985–2000 ISBN 3-518-03234-8
  - Aus dem Bleistiftgebiet Band 3. Räuber-Roman, Felix-Szenen. Hg. v. Bernhard Echte u. Werner Morlang i. A. des Robert Walser-Archivs der Carl Seelig-Stiftung, Zürich. Frankfurt am Main: Suhrkamp Verlag 1985–2000 ISBN 3-518-03085-X
  - Aus dem Bleistiftgebiet Band 4. Mikrogramme 1926/27. Hg. v. Bernhard Echte u. Werner Morlang i. A. des Robert Walser-Archivs der Carl Seelig-Stiftung, Zürich. Frankfurt am Main: Suhrkamp Verlag 1985–2000 ISBN 3-518-40224-2
  - Aus dem Bleistiftgebiet Band 5. Mikrogramme 1925/33. Hg. v. Bernhard Echte u. Werner Morlang i. A. des Robert Walser-Archivs der Carl Seelig-Stiftung, Zürich. Frankfurt am Main: Suhrkamp Verlag 1985–2000 ISBN 3-518-40851-8
  - Aus dem Bleistiftgebiet Band 6. Mikrogramme 1925/33. Hg. v. Bernhard Echte u. Werner Morlang i. A. des Robert Walser-Archivs der Carl Seelig-Stiftung, Zürich. Frankfurt am Main: Suhrkamp Verlag 1985–2000 ISBN 3-518-40851-8
- Unsere Stadt. Texte über Biel. 2002 ISBN 3-907142-04-7
- Feuer. Unbekannte Prosa und Gedichte. 2003 ISBN 3-518-41356-2
- Tiefer Winter. Geschichten von der Weihnacht und vom Schneien. Hg. v. Margit Gigerl, Livia Knüsel u. Reto Sorg. Frankfurt: Insel Taschenbuch Verlag 2007 (it; 3326), ISBN 978-3-458-35026-2
- Kritische Robert Walser-Ausgabe. Kritische Ausgabe sämtlicher Drucke und Manuskripte. Hg. v. Wolfram Groddeck, Barbara von Reibnitz u.a. Basel, Frankfurt am Main: Stroemfeld, Schwabe 2008
- Briefe. Berner Ausgabe. Hg. v. Lucas Marco Gisi, Reto Sorg, Peter Stocker u. Peter Utz. Berlin: Suhrkamp Verlag 2018

=== English translations ===
==== Novels ====
- The Tanners ca. 1907 (New Directions, 2009), translated by Susan Bernofsky, ISBN 978-0-8112-1589-3
- The Assistant ca. 1908 (New Directions, 2007), translated by Susan Bernofsky, ISBN 978-0-8112-1590-9
- Jakob von Gunten ca. 1909 (University of Texas Press, 1970; New York Review Books Classics, 1999), translated by Christopher Middleton, ISBN 0-940322-21-8
- The Robber ca. 1922 (University of Nebraska Press, 2000), translated by Susan Bernofsky, ISBN 0-8032-9809-9

==== List of short works in English ====
- See: List of short works that have been translated into English

==== Collections of shorter works ====
- The Walk and Other Stories (Calder Publishing, 1957), translated by Christopher Middleton
- Selected Stories (Farrar, Straus, Giroux, 1982; New York Review Books Classics, 2002), translated by Christopher Middleton, ISBN 0-940322-98-6
- Masquerade and Other Stories (The Johns Hopkins University Press, 1990), translated by Susan Bernofsky, foreword by William H. Gass ISBN 0-8018-3977-7
- Speaking to the Rose (University of Nebraska Press, 2005), translated by Christopher Middleton, ISBN 0-8032-9833-1
- Microscripts (New Directions, 2010), translated by Susan Bernofsky, ISBN 978-0-8112-1880-1
- Answer to an Inquiry (Ugly Duckling Presse, 2010), translated by Paul North, with drawings by Friese Undine, ISBN 978-1933254746
- Berlin Stories (New York Review Books Classics, 2012), translated by Susan Bernofsky, ISBN 978-1-59017-454-8
- The Walk (New Directions, 2012), translated by Christopher Middleton with Susan Bernofsky, ISBN 9780811219921
- A Little Ramble: In the Spirit of Robert Walser (New Directions, 2012), translated by Susan Bernofsky with Christopher Middleton and Tom Whalen ISBN 978-0811220996
- A Schoolboy's Diary (New York Review Books Classics, 2013), translated by Damion Searls, introduction by Ben Lerner, ISBN 9781590176726
- Looking at Pictures (Christine Burgin / New Directions, 2015), translated by Susan Bernofsky with Lydia Davis and Christopher Middleton, ISBN 9780811224246
- Girlfriends, Ghosts, and Other Stories (New York Review Books Classics, 2016), translated by Tom Whalen, with Nicole Kongeter and Annette Wiesner, afterword by Tom Whalen, ISBN 978-1681370163
- Little Snow Landscape (New York Review Books, 2021), trans. Tom Whalen

==== Poetry ====
- Thirty Poems (New Directions, 2012), translated by Christopher Middleton, ISBN 978-0811220019
- Oppressive Light: Selected Poems by Robert Walser (Black Lawrence Press/Dzanc Books, New York, 2012), edited and translated by Daniele Pantano, ISBN 978-1-93687-318-0
- Robert Walser: The Poems (Seagull Books, 2022), translated by Daniele Pantano
- My Heart Has So Many Flaws: Early Poems (Sublunary Editions, 2024), translated by Kristofor Minta

==== Plays ====
- Robert Walser Rediscovered: Stories, Fairy-Tale Plays, & Critical Response Including the Anti-Fairy Tales, Cinderella & Snow White (University Press of New England, 1985), edited by Mark Harman ISBN 0-87451-334-0
- Fairy Tales: Dramolettes (New Directions, 2015), translated by James Reidel and Daniele Pantano, with a preface by Reto Sorg, ISBN 978-0-8112-2398-0
- Comedies (Seagull Books, 2018), translated by Daniele Pantano and James Reidel, with a preface by Reto Sorg, ISBN 978-0857424693

== Adaptations ==
=== Movies ===
- Jakob von Gunten, director: Peter Lilienthal, script: Ror Wolf and Peter Lilienthal, 1971
- Der Gehülfe, director: Thomas Koerfer, 1975
- Der Vormund und sein Dichter, direction and script: Percy Adlon, 1978 (free picturization of Seelig's Wanderungen mit Robert Walser)
- Robert Walser (1974–1978), direction and script: HHK Schoenherr
- Waldi, direction and script: Reinhard Kahn, Michael Leiner (after the story Der Wald), 1980
- The Comb, directors: Stephen Quay, Timothy Quay (i.e. Brothers Quay), 1990
- Brentano, director: Romeo Castellucci, with Paolo Tonti as Brentano, 1995
- Institute Benjamenta, or This Dream People Call Human Life, directors: Stephen Quay, Timothy Quay (i.e. Brothers Quay) with Mark Rylance as Jakob von Gunten, 1995
- Blanche Neige, directed by Rudolph Straub, music by Giovanna Marini, 1999
- Branca de Neve, director: João César Monteiro, 2000
- All This Can Happen, directors: Siobhan Davies, David Hinton, 2012

=== Opera ===
- Schneewittchen, 1998, by Heinz Holliger

=== Plays ===
- Institute Benjamenta, director: Gökçen Ergene

=== Music ===
- Robert Walser – mikrogramme – das kleine welttheater, director: Christian Bertram, stage: Max Dudler, music: Hans Peter Kuhn, début performance 14 April 2005 Berlin; readings, films and podium discussion with corollary program www.mikrogramme.de
