= Jakob von Gunten =

1909 novel by Robert Walser

Jakob von Gunten. Ein Tagebuch is a 1909 German-language novel by Swiss writer Robert Walser about a child who enrolls at a school for servants, where strangely no teachers are ever seen. (Note: The child narrator speculates that the educators "are asleep, or they are dead, or seemingly dead, or they are fossilized, no matter, in any case we get nothing from them") in the beginning that It later received an English translation and publication in 1969.

== Background ==
Walser based the novel on his own experiences: upon arriving in Berlin in 1905 he attended a school for servants, and served as a butler the following winter at the castle of Dambrau in Upper Silesia.

== Plot ==
Jakob von Gunten narrates the story in first-person. He comes from a well-off family. His father has a car and horse at his disposal and his mother has her own box at the theatre. His brother Johann is a well-known, established artist, who cultivates a bourgeois lifestyle and moves in elite circles. Jakob runs away from home in order to escape the overbearing shadow of his father, an alderman. He decides to spend the rest of his life serving others and enrolls at the Benjamenta Institute, a school for servants where strangely no teachers are ever seen. The headmaster of the institute is Herr Benjamenta. Due to a lack of teaching staff, the pupils are taught by the headmaster's sister, Lisa Benjamenta. There are in fact more teachers, but they are either absent or said to be fast asleep. The pupils are trained as servants with the aim of securing a job. The teaching predominantly consists of learning-by-heart from one of the institute's brochures with the title "What is the aim of Benjamenta’s School for Boys?" and from the "Rules". The pupils willingly let themselves be treated like children, drilled and pushed hard. A principle of the institute is: "Little, but thoroughly". They are taught how to deal with people in social situations through theory and role-play.

As a new pupil, Jakob is tested by the headmaster. At first he rebels, walks into his office and demands his money back, resenting the poor quality of the education. But then he acquiesces and ends his attempts at revolution. Jakob later gets mixed up in a fight and receives a hit to the head from the headmaster who does not ascertain who was initially responsible. Jakob does not feel inferior. On the contrary, he has ample self-confidence and considers himself the brightest among his classmates. Jakob considers himself conceited and arrogant. His pride is slightly injured and Jakob presumes that he is being dumbed down by the institute. He knows in any case that he is being made to look small.

The headmaster confesses to Jakob that he has a fondness for him which he can no longer control. He perceives something special in Jakob. The headmaster has no explanation for this. Jakob is also surprised, but knows how to act around superiors. He wisely says nothing in reply – even when the headmaster confesses his love for him. When Jakob is supposed to become the friend and confidant of the headmaster the pupil is hesitant. Jakob does not get a job through the headmaster because the headmaster, already over 40, loves someone for the first time and doesn't want to let him go. But then Jakob becomes afraid; the headmaster wants to choke him. Later, however, the headmaster wants to kiss Jakob. Outraged, the splendid young boy refuses.

Frau Benjamenta tells Jakob she is going to die. Herr Benjamenta and Jakob sit in vigil over her dead body before she is taken away. The school has been failing for a long time, with a falling intake of pupils. Jakob agrees to pack up and go travelling with Herr Benjamenta.

== Reception ==
Nobel Prize laureate J. M. Coetzee published his review — a reappreciation of an almost forgotten classic — in The New York Review of Books in 2000. It was later reprinted in his Inner Workings: Literary Essays, 2000-2005.

Scholar Samuel Frederick wrote, "the fact that a reviewer praised the novel as "one of the wittiest, wackiest, most charming and most civilized satires I have ever read" can be taken as evidence of the quality of Middleton's translation and his sensitivity to Walser's eccentric style."

In 2008, the Süddeutsche Zeitung chose Jakob von Gunten as one of 100 "great novels of the 20th century" (a selection which includes translations from other languages). Electric Lit listed it among the most "groundbreaking experimental" novels that were more than 100 years old. They wrote that it disregards traditional plot and is "full of fanciful, obsessive digressions on the nature of objects, light, and smiles," and that Walser showed a satisfying narrative could be "almost wholly internal" and meandering.

Franz Kafka owned a copy and said it was a "good book" in a letter to a friendly director, Eisner.

== Style, themes, analysis ==
Ben Lerner at The New Yorker has argued that most of Walser's narrators have a schoolboy-like levity, "an unmistakable combination of insight and (faux?) naivete, poetic license and (mock?) servility."

Christopher Middleton in the afterword argues that Walser in Jakob von Gunten uses an "ordinary and internalized narrative" that turns the novel into 'an analytic fictional soliloquy.'" The style differs significantly from Walser's previous novels The Tanners and The Assistant.

== Publication History ==
- 1909 - The first edition of the German original was published in Berlin by Bruno Cassirer.
- 1969 - Jakob von Gunten, translated to English from the German and with an Introduction by Christopher Middleton, published by University of Texas Press
- 1983 - The 1969 English translation by Middleton re-printed by Vintage Books in New York
- 1999 - The 1969 Middleton translation is reprinted by NYRB Classics (ISBN 978-0940322219) and with covert art from a Karl Walser illustration.
- 2008 - The Süddeutsche Zeitung published a special edition for the 100 "great novels of the 20th century" honor.

Today the novel is available in a number of editions, most notably by Suhrkamp Verlag.

== Adaptations ==
=== Film ===
- A 1971 German television movie, Jakob von Gunten, was directed by Peter Lilienthal.
- In 1995, the novel was adapted into the film Institute Benjamenta, or This Dream People Call Human Life by the Brothers Quay, starring Mark Rylance as Jakob von Gunten.

=== Other ===
- A 1976 reading performance was done on Swiss radio in 1976.
