= Masquerade and Other Stories =

1990 short story collection by Robert Walser translated by Susan Bernofsky

- The 1993 Quartet Books edition
- Author: Robert Walser
- Translator: Susan Bernofsky
- Language: English
- Publisher: Johns Hopkins University Press
- Publication date: 1990
- Publication place: United States
- Media type: Print
- Pages: 202

Masquerade and Other Stories is a 1990 English-language short story collection of 64 works by the Swiss author Robert Walser, including feuilletons, short stories, and prose pieces. The works are translated by Susan Bernofsky. The book is published by the Johns Hopkins University Press.

== Background ==
The included pieces date from 1896 to 1933 and are organized by the city Walser resided at the time of composition: Zurich, Berlin, Biel, and Bern. Walser moved to Zurich around 1896 and worked odd jobs, and published his first work (poems) in a Bern newspaper at about age 20. He then lived in Berlin for 8 years, where his brother Karl Walser was a successful painter and stage set designer and gave Robert access to artistic social circles (more works from this period are collected in Berlin Stories). He had many prose pieces published in newspapers and periodicals during this time, often in the form of feuilletons.

Because Walser's three novels published between 1907 and 1909 were commercial failures, he retreated to the short story and feuilleton, or in his words "withdrew into the snail shell" of these short forms. He had several books of prose pieces published in this period. In 1929, Walser entered a sanatorium and continued to write, but stopped when he was later transferred against his will.

The book is Susan Bernofsky's first volume of translation. She later became a prolific and widely known translator of nine Walser volumes. Susan Bernofsky argues in her preface that "Robert Walser was a writer whose singular, virtuoso, absolutely essential otherness cost him the favor of the reading public of his day. For the bourgeois tastes prevalent in Switzerland and Germany during the first third of this century, these texts were far too eccentric, unstaid, inattentive to established literary values and conventions."

=== Format and genre ===
Also see: Main Robert Walser article: Format and genre.

The included pieces are a mixture of fictional story, non-fictional essay, personal musings, sketches, reports, and "walks through landscapes and dreamscapes" in Bernofsky's words.

Walser called most of his non-novel non-verse work "prose pieces" and feuilletons. Feuilleton refers to the physical format of publication in a certain section of a newspaper, and can also refer to the free-ranging style of the pieces which are otherwise uncategorizable.

== Style and themes ==
The New York Times review noted that the pieces "are short-short stories, [...] reminiscences, wanderings, nature studies; musings of a man waking, observing and doubting yet striving to discover some joy close to home." Andrew Thacker said that Walser's short Berlin pieces are "metropolitan miniatures on Berlin Elektropolis, exploring features such as its department stores, the new electric trams, and the lights of hte advertisements clutterying the city streets.

Bernofsky's introduction says that Walser's work is "a scintillating web of contradictions and ironies, full of startling, skewed comparisons, a skittish and lyrical voice unlike any other." Walser's narrator's voice is often likened to a stroller observing the world.

William H. Gass argues in his foreword to the book that Walser pre-figured post-modernism.

== Reception ==
Herbert Mitgang in a review at The New York Times wrote that Walser's fueilletons have certain observations that resemble passages of Kafka. Mitgang states that Kafka praised the simplicity, surrealism, and the "blurring employment of abstract metaphors" in Walser's writings.

Kirkus Reviews called Walser a "strange, precious, French-style writer" and stated, "[his] little gems tickle the postmodern fancy. [...] Walser is filled with little Chaplinesque flips of the foot. Interesting, hothouse prose by a writer who was quirkiness through and through." The reviewer also thought the volume "gave stronger flavors" than the previous collection Selected Stories (1982).

== Publication History ==
- 1990 - Johns Hopkins University Press
- 1993 - Quartet Books Limited (Great Britain)

== Pieces included ==
Headers below follow the named section categories in the book.

=== Zurich (1896-1905) ===
- ”Lake Greifen” (1899)
- ”From Fritz Kocher’s Essays” (Note: Additional pieces from "Fritz Kocher's Essays" are published in A Schoolboy's Diary) (1902)

Autumn
Professions
Country Fair
Music

- ”Two Stories” (1902)

"The Genius" (Note: The genius is named Wenzel in the first line.)
"The World"

- ”Simon” (Subtitled: 'A Love Story') (1903)
- ”The Gloves” (1905)

=== Berlin (1905-1913) ===
- "Good Morning, Giantess!" (1907)
- "Comedy Evening" (1907)
- ”Aschinger” (Note: A short piece about a rapid service chain restaurant which was a new advent at a time when mass transit allowed an unprecedented flow of people through certain areas of the city quickly. Berlin's first subway opened in 1902) (1907)
- ”Mountain Halls” (Note: A description of a variety show venue on Unter den Linden. Max Brod said that this story was one of Franz Kafka's favorites, and that Kafka would laugh hysterically when reading it aloud.) (1908)
- ”Market” (1908)
- ”The Battle of Sempach” (Note: A historical fiction imagining of violent combat in the 14th century) (190*
- "Tableau Vivant" (1909)
- ”Food (I)” (Note: The "(I)" refers to this being one of several similar pieces with the same title. The first sentence is, "Veal fricandeau is frightful stuff.") (1911)

=== Biel (1913-1921) ===
- ”Johanna” (Note: The narrator describes a romance with a woman, Johanna, while he is lodging in a room at the parcel postman's, Senn, who is angry about the romance) (1913)
- ”The Violet” (Note: The narrator strolles through a park-like garden-filled villa district. A beautiful woman approaches him, but then departs. The narrator has a reverie that he met a "tall, brown-eyed, violet in the shape of a woman" who then vanishes.) (1915)
- "Marie" (Note: One of the longest Walser short prose pieces at about 14 pages. The narrator describes his residential situation, father, a "garret" lodging on the premises of a Frau Bandi, and repeated chance-meetings with a woman on a forest path.) (1916)
- "Fraulein Knuchel” (1917)
- ”Basta” (1917)
- ”Fritz” (Note: Somewhat similar to Fritz Kocher's Essays. The narrator talks about several subjects. Each subject is introduced with an interjection of a capital TOPIC word between paragraphs: SEMINARY, ROME, AMSTERDAM (the narrator diverts in this section to brief mention of Pisa, Ravenna, Palace of Theodoric, and Venice), ZURICH, THURINGIA, BERLIN, LADY, POSITION OF TRUST, OPTIMISTS, BOSOM, HAND, SEAM. The last few topics are an erotic comical sequence with a woman.)
- ”Tobold (II)” (Note: About 20 pages in length. Includes "Essay on the Aristocracy".) (1920)
- ”The End of the World” (1917)
- ”I Have Nothing” (Note: On a countryside walk, a cheerful carefree pauper is approached by a sequence of silent domesticated animals including a calf, a dog, and a nanny goat. Part of the narration says: "He'd have liked to help [them] cross over from the narrow, poor animal realm into a freer, better existence. 'But I am nothing, can do nothing, and have, for heaven's sake, nothing [...].") (1917)
- ”The Aunt” (Note: The narrator walks to various landscapes, lodgings, and towns. The narrator compares himself to a robber and Rinaldini. A cousin inadvertently crosses paths with him, they chat, and then visit his aunt. The next morning, the aunt attempts to give him a new suit and the narrator makes a long Walserian speech to decline it.) (1918)
- ”The Old Fountain” (1919)
- ”The Dinner Party” (1919)
- ”The Last Prose Piece” (1919)

=== Berne (1921-1933) ===
- ”The Alphabet”
- ”Ladies' Shoes”
- ”Energetic”
- ”Robert the Rascal”
- ”Fridolin”
- ”Should Promises Be Broken?”
- ”The Elephant”
- ”The Sweetheart”
- ”The One of Fairy Tales”
- ”The Green Spider”
- ”She's such a nice woman ...”
- ”Goddess of Poetry ...”
- ”The Strange Girl”
- ”The Chinese Woman, the Chinaman”
- ”A Lump of Sugar”
- ”fe t'adore”
- ”Kurt”
- ”Horse and Bear”
- ”Sunday Walk (I)”
- ”Letter to Edith”
- ”Salon Episode”
- ”Birthday Prose Piece”
- ”An Immortal”
- ”There exist drunken geniuses ...”
- ”All those who like to laugh while crying...”
- ”A Flaubert Prose Piece”
- ”Minotaur”
- ”Masquerade”
- ”Sampler Plate”
- ”Prose Piece”
- ”Moonlight Story”
- ”Beneath a Linden”
- ”I Was Reading in the Forest”
- ”The Boy (II)”
- ”A Small Town”
- ”The Worn-out Man”
- ”Boat Trip”
- ”The Girl (II)”
