= Speaking to the Rose (Walser short story collection) =

2005 short story collection by Robert Walser translated by Christopher Middleton

Speaking to the Rose: Writings, 1912–1932
- Author: Robert Walser
- Translator: Christopher Middleton
- Language: English
- Publisher: University of Nebraska Press
- Publication date: 2005
- Publication place: United States
- Media type: Print
- Pages: 134

Speaking to the Rose is a 2005 English-language short story collection of 50 works by the Swiss author Robert Walser, including feuilletons, short stories, prose pieces, and a poem. The works are translated by Christopher Middleton. The book is published by the University of Nebraska Press.

The included works date from 1912 to 1932 and focus on Walser's pieces that hadn't been previously collected in book form. The book includes 14 translations from the "pencil area" or "microscripts" (aka the B texts or "Bleistiftgebiet"), which were manuscripts Walser had written in a tiny coded script on random papers and cards.

== Background ==
=== Microscripts ===
It took 17 years for German scholars Bernhard Echte and Werner Morlang to decipher Walser's microscripts, which they did at the Robert Walser archive in Zurich. 14 pieces from those manuscripts are included. Middleton notes in the preface that although these texts are "the outcome of judicious and gradual deciphering", they were never finalized, polished, or proofread by Walser himself. The final results of the deciphering and transcription process have only a small number of "doubts" (i.e. remaining ambiguities), which aren't considered substantial.

=== Title ===
The line "speaking to the rose" appears in the included piece "The Gifted Person." Flowers and roses are also mentioned by Walser in several other included pieces. One of Walser's published books in his lifetime was titled The Rose ("Die Rose" in German) in 1925.

== Format and genre ==
Tom Whalen described the format or category of the works as "feuilletons, sketches, stories, rambles, essays, improvisations" and settled on the word writings as the best term.

== Reception ==
In a review at the London Review of Books, Michel Hofmann said that Walser "resists [a] summary description". Hofmann cataloged many seemingly contradictory descriptions in analyses of Walser, and stated that all were true. Hofmann also quoted Christopher Middleton, writing that Walser is a "wild particle" who people read for "his blithe difference from colleagues in any age or any condition – for his perfect and serene oddity."

In a review at Marginalia, Tom Whalen wrote that "Walser’s central themes of self-effacement, the primacy of the imagination, the liberating aim of creative play are richly displayed in the new volume." Whalen praised the piece "The Gifted Person" as "astonishing improvisation, designed simultaneously to inspirit language, ironize kitsch, and mock the arbiters of literature who judge books only by the principles that can be extracted from them." Whalen also said that readers are fortunate for Christopher Middleton's "quirky brilliance" as a poet and skilled translator.

== Style and themes ==
Noted scholar and translator Mark Harman wrote in a review that Walser "infuses every page he writes with a sensibility that is, as one of Walser's figures says of himself, 'alert to everything.'" Harman argued that the intense self-consciousness in Walser's voice makes the fragmented portrait modern. He called Walser's cast of characters "constantly in flux, [..] they speak with unmistakable voices. By turns effusive and reticent, self-effacing and self-inflating, long-winded and laconic, solitary and convivial, their beguiling voices lure us into Walser's web." Harman also said the narrators and personae are "prone to wayward meditations, sudden enthusiasms, and startling flashes of insight." He noted Walser's blend of naivete, sophistication, and insouciance.

== Pieces included ==
The 14 titles below that have non-standard title capitalization, i.e. lowercase keywords, are works from Walser's microscript manuscripts (the penciled "B" texts or "Bleistiftgebiet"), which Walser never finalized or edited himself.

- "A Note on Van Gogh’s L'Arlesienne" (1912)
- "Brentano" (Note: German romantic poet Clemens Brentano) (1913)
- "Writing Geschwister Tanner" (1914)
- "The Back Alley" (Note: Original German title "Die Untere Gasse", meaning "The Lower Lane". Middleton notes that his re-titling is inaccurate, relates the terminology to city landscapes like Zurich, and speculates Walser's scene in this piece must be in Biel.) (1916)
- "The Story of the Prodigal Son" (1917)
- "The Cave Man" (Note: The narrator contemplates if there's any difference between cave-men and modern people.) (1918)
- "Dreaming" (1920)
- "Hercules" (1920)
- "Odysseus" (Note: In the words of Mark Harman, Walser transforms the ancient Greek mythical heroes into "parodic mundane life-stories" in which they do daily household Swiss-style chores.) (1920)
- "Theseus" (1920)
- "Olga’s Story" (Note: A woman narrates parts of her life, including a romance that ends up with the man leaving her for another woman, and the couple visits her which has a tormenting effect, yet the woman lives with them for a time). (1921)
- "Something about Goethe" (1921)
- "The Robber" (Note: Also see The Robber) (1921)
- "The One and Only" (Note: Seemingly describes a woman. The first lines are, "She to whom poems are addressed, who is significant, who writes no poems hut is a poem significant to a poet—I know her. If one is fresh with her, she shows only glorious astonishment. I have sung her, but not yet to my satisfaction.") (1924 composition, 1938 published)
- "Finally she condescended" (1924)
- "The Fairytale Town" (1925)
- "The Blind Man" (1925)
- "And now he was playing, alas, the piano" (1925)
- "An Essay on Lion Taming" (1925)
- "These little services" (Note: Narrates a vision of a countess who rides toward the narrator on a horse.) (1925)
- "Ramses II" (Note: In Mark Harman's analysis, the Pharoah is depicted as an addict of trashy novels and shares Walser's tendency to "antagonize educated people." The work also refers to Johann Künzle, an herbalist who had an influential work published in 1911) (1925)
- "Spanish Wine Hall" (1925)
- "It can so happen that" (Note: This piece refers to the Rif War in Morocco) (1926)
- "Brentano (III)" (Note: The "III" refers to this being Walser's third piece on the subject) (1926)
- "From the Life of a Writer" (1926)
- "Letter of a European" (Note: Among other things, this piece connects to Walser's anger at Thomas Mann having called Walser's 1925 book Die Rose childish) (1926)
- "O how in this not large" (Note: Discusses the social, historical, and architectural aspects of a lakeside palace or cloister.) (1926)
- "Apparently not a cloud was to be seen" (Note: Describes the natural scenery, birds, and social history of a region the narrator has visited. The story doesn't specify the exact place, because: "Where this country, or neck-of-the-woods, is, I’d therefore rather not tell, otherwise everything on two legs would travel and leap and rush and walk thither, disconcerting it with curiosity, which usually has nasty and noxious results.") (1926)
- "The White Lady" (Note: Discusses a figure that the narrator saw but doesn't want to talk about, an "apparition" of a woman, a male adversary of the narrator, and a walk that took 20 hours. The final line is that the woman "could be the soul of Europe, perhaps even the World Soul, motionless there, not willing to walk any more.") (1926)
- "The Red Thread" (Note: Seemingly a contemplation on desire, which the narrator calls a red thread running through history and compares to a woman on a horse. The piece discusses Paradise, freedom, and the development of civilizations. "It seems indisputable that the concept of conquest and the idea of freedom become almost indistinguishable [...].") (1926)
- "I would like to be standing" (1927) (Note: Year of composition is not known with certainy)
- "Loud expressions of opinion" (1927)
- "Letter to a Patient Lady" (1927)
- "The stage-space might have measured" (Note: The piece includes reference to a woman named Preziosa) (1927)
- "Looking out into the landscape" (1927)
- "It’s still not so long ago" (Note: The first lines are, "It’s still not so long ago that I had an urge sometimes to roar. A rage, directed mainly against myself, turned my inner life into a quivering phosphoric bog.") (1927)
- "Cabaret Scene" (Note: Middleton reports that he changed the format of the piece to a versified play script though the original format was prose, and labels the piece as a "dramolet or minidrama long before the "Hörspiel" or radio play was instituted.") (1927)
- "The idea was a delicate one" (Note: Includes allusion to Sage Graf von Gleichen) (1928)
- "Execution Story" (Note: A sketch of a critical tribunal calling for a writer's death over having written an unliked book, which the narrator says the author was seduced into writing by an "uncommonly nice woman, who now and then offered him a bonbon.") (1928)
- "To a Poet" (Note: May refer to Hugo von Hofmannsthal and/or Albert Steffen) (1928)
- "She addressed me in the formal style" (Note: Christopher Middleton categorizes this piece among microscript sketches where Walser retells stories, real or made-up, after gleaning ideas from the jackets of trashy novels (which Walser defended as part of literary tradition).) (1928)
- "Prose Piece" (Note: A nature piece. The first lines are, "Between snowflakes and leaves there are resemblances. At the sight of snow falling one thinks that one is seeing small flowers that are falling from the sky. Why is foliage dying in the autumn secretly golden, and why does one think of springtime flowers having tongues, to shape some kind of conversation?") (1927 or 1929)
- "My Endeavors" (1928)
- "I Was Reading Two Stories" (1930)
- "A Propos the Kissing of a Hand" (1930)
- "The Avenue" (Note: The narrator speaks of a beautiful avenue around a lake that he has found, and discusses a painter he observed who doesn't know about the avenue. The narrator is also distracted by thoughts of food.) (1931)
- "Heroic Landscape" (1931)
- "The Gifted Person" (Note: Middleton identifies the location as Bahnhofstrasse in Zurich, but Tom Whalen believes that was a mistake and points to Biel, explaining that both cities have a Bahnhofstrasse. The piece also refers to Potsdamer Platz in Berlin) (1932)
- "The Lake" (Note: Also see two other Walser pieces about lakes in "Greifen Lake" and "By the Lake", collected in A Schoolboy's Diary) (1932)
- ""Kennst Du sie?" (Note: I.e. "Do you know her?") (1930, poem. Presented in the Epilogue.)
