= Little Snow Landscape =

2021 Short story collection by Robert Walser

- Author: Robert Walser
- Translator: Tom Whalen
- Language: English
- Publisher: New York Review Books
- Publication date: 2021
- Publication place: United States
- Media type: Print
- Pages: 188

Little Snow Landscape is a 2021 English-language collection of 69 short stories, feuilletons, and prose pieces by the Swiss author Robert Walser. The selected writings range from the years 1905 to 1933 and are translated by Tom Whalen.

== Background ==
=== Format and genre ===
Tom Whalen writes in the notes that the selected prose pieces include many types: essaylets, fables, idylls, tales of comedy and horror, monologues, travelogues, and both realistic and otherworldly prose pieces. (Also see the main article section on Robert Walser's feuilleton format.) A reviewer called the apparent categories of writing, "a mischievous diversity, held together by a uniform but highly ambiguous tone. All miniatures, the longest running to ten pages, the shortest half a page."

=== Selection ===
All but three of the included pieces had not previously been translated to English. The last writing in the collection, "Childhood," is thought to be Walser's last prose piece.

Whalen arranged the selection chronologically by original publication or composition, and attempted to create "a kind of novel, however apparently plotless."

== Style and themes ==
In a review at the Cleveland Review, Duncan Stuart argues that W.G. Sebald's oft-quoted statements about Walser are inaccurate and contradictory, specifically the claim that Walser did not pay attention to world events, yet was supposedly in Sebald's poetic description a "clairvoyant" observer, and the claim that Walser was not affected by World War I. Stuart notes that Walser's early work has "an immense reflective and powerful sense of beauty [and] wonder" that later changed to heartbreak and melancholy "as modernity disintegrates" in WWI and Europe moved toward catastrophe during the rise of naziism. Stuart argues that both Kafka and Walser "tracked what Hannah Arendt calls the 'atmosphere of disintegration'" between WWI and WWII, in which national rivalries, economic disaster for middle class people, unemployment, violent civil wars, and refugee migrations, occurred on an unprecedented scale that was seemingly unstoppable. Stuart also connects a quote in the included piece "Holderlin", a fictionalized dialog wherein Holderin's "mistress of the house" advises him, "couldnʼt the renunciation of greatness not also be greatness?", to Walser's apparent decision in 1933 to stop writing.

Brian Dillon wrote in a review, "[in some stories] [Walser] is a writer of pastoral idylls of quite bewitching calm, pitched between medieval dream poem and Romantic interlude." Dillon raises the questions, "how are we supposed to read [the] narrative swerves, when the style remains oddly unaffected, deadpan, almost childish? How much is Walser putting us on?" and whether all the narrators are unreliable. Dillon also observes that some of Walser's works bring to mind the “garret-bound scribes and dreamers" in Gogol, Dostoevsky, and Melville.

== Reception ==
The New York Times wrote that the "brief limpid essays and stories range widely in approach and subject, but cohere through avid curiosity and delight." A reviewer at Publishers Weekly wrote that they were "struck by the author’s abiding good nature and boundless sympathy." They also said that the book is a charming testament to the author’s virtuosity. The book was also reviewed at the Times Literary Supplement.

== Pieces included ==
Numbers in parentheses mean Walser wrote more than once piece with the same title.

- "To My Home" (1905)
- "Two Little Fairy Tales"
- "Lenz’s Soldiers"
- "The Writer (I)"
- "Wenzel"
- "Farewell" (Note: Narrated by Abdul Hamid II, Turkey’s last sultan. Hamid was dethroned in 1909, the year the story was published in Neue Rundschau.)
- "Illusion"
- "Büchner’s Flight"
- "Cinema"
- "Birch-Pfeiffer"
- "Lenz"
- "The Hermitage"
- "Dream Vision"
- "The Dressmaker" (Note: In Brian Dillon's words, "a young woman goes to bed terrified in her sad, cavernous apartment. Sure enough, Death slides under the blankets with her, and by morning [...]: 'She lay there dead in her bed.'")
- "The Landscape (I)"
- "Walking"
- "The Shepherd"
- "The Invitation" (1914)
- "Sunday Morning"
- "The Moon"
- "Stroll (I)"
- "Little Snow Landscape"
- "Summer Night"
- "Christmas"
- "Hölderlin"
- "Würzburg"
- "The Worker"
- "Chamber Piece"
- "The Coward"
- "The Sausage"
- "Lamp, Paper, and Gloves"
- "Berta"
- "Louise"
- "Rain" (1918)
- "Pencil Note"
- "Letter from Biel"
- "The First Poem"
- "The Comrade"
- "The Proletarian"
- "The Aviator"
- "Munich"
- "Jean"
- "The Two Writers"
- "Mutterseelenallein"
- "Don Juan’s Letter"
- "Three Stories, Told Based on Book Covers"
- "The Beauty and the Faithful One"
- "The Angel"
- "Children and Small Houses"
- "Geneva"
- "The Yardstick"
- "Four Characters"
- "Notebook Extract"
- "The Young Servant"
- "A Lackey"
- "A Sort of Narrative"
- "Fairy Tale (II)"
- "Book Review" (1928)
- "Vacation (I)"
- "Fragment"
- "Walk in the Park"
- "Recently I Read . . ."
- "The Four Seasons"
- "Stroll (II)"
- "The Castle"
- "Hats"
- "Sunday Outing"
- "The Canal"
- "Childhood" (1933)
