= Robert Walser Center =

The Robert Walser Center, which was officially established in Bern, Switzerland, in 2009, is dedicated to Robert Walser and the first patron of Walser’s work and legacy, Carl Seelig. Its purpose is to promulgate Walser’s life and work as well as to facilitate scholarly research. The Center is open to both experts and the general public and includes an extensive archive, a research library, temporary exhibition space, and two rooms with several workstations are also available. The Center furthermore develops and organizes exhibitions, events, conferences, workshops, publications, and special editions. The translation of Robert Walser’s works, which the Center both encourages and supports, also represents a key focus. In order to fully meet its objectives and responsibilities as a center of excellence, it often collaborates on certain projects with local, national, and international partners as well as universities, schools, theaters, museums, archives, translators, editors, and publishers.

== History ==
The lawyer Elio Fröhlich founded the Carl Seelig Foundation in 1966, which in turn established the Robert Walser Archive in 1973, in order to maintain and expand Walser’s literary estate as well as make it available to an ever-increasing number of scholars and researchers. In 2004, the foundation was renamed the Robert Walser Foundation Zurich. The following individuals served as directors of the Robert Walser Archive from 1973 until the present (in chronological order): Katharina Kerr, Guido Stefani, Werner Morlang, Bernhard Echte, Margit Gigerl, Lucas Marco Gisi, and Lukas Gloor.

In 2009, the Foundation underwent a major structural reorganization, relocated to Bern, and was renamed the Robert Walser Foundation Bern. The Robert Walser Center was opened the same year, overseen by the founding director Reto Sorg. Since then, the Robert Walser Archive is considered a major and central part of the Robert Walser Center.

That same year also saw the introduction of volunteers, who support the staff and their scholarly activities; they also make it possible for the Centre to maintain regular opening hours.

== Robert Walser Archive ==
The archive contains the Robert Walser Collection, which includes manuscripts, letters, personal papers, and an ever-expanding collection of secondary literature, which is continuously being catalogued, documented, and analyzed. Although still owned by the Robert Walser Foundation, these valuable and sensitive manuscripts (including the so-called “Micrograms” or “Microscripts”) were transferred in 2009 to the Swiss Literary Archives (SLA) of the Swiss National Library in Bern. Since the 1980s, the Robert Walser Center and the Robert Walser Archive regularly work on special editions and other publications regarding Robert Walser.

== Exhibitions ==
The Robert Walser Center regularly stages thematically alternating exhibitions about the life, work, and artistic influence of Robert Walser. Recent exhibitions have featured Walser’s first editions, Micrograms, and letters, as well as exhibitions featuring artists such as Robert Frank, Tilo Steireif, Thomas Hirschhorn, Yves Netzhammer, Thomas Schütte and Pamela Rosenkranz.
