= Kleist in Thun =

Short story by Robert Walser

Kleist in Thun is a 1913 short story by Swiss writer Robert Walser that tells a fictionalized sketch of Heinrich von Kleist's (real-life) temporary stay in the town of Thun in 1802. It was originally published in German, and later translated into English by Christopher Middleton and published by Calder Publishing in 1957. It has been described as a "lightly disguised self-portrait of a conflicted writer wrestling with his demons."

== Background ==
Walser lived in Thun for a few months in spring 1899, and worked in a brewery that existed at the time. Walser had observed the island house on the Aare River in Thun where Kleist temporarily stayed in the 1800s. Kleist's stay happened at an early point in his career when he was creating his first plays, hadn't yet been published, and was having a personal and intellectual crisis. Walser used Kleist's letters for many details of the story. Walser struggled with mental illness, and like Kleist, received little recognition in his lifetime.

As writer Chris Power reports, "When Kleist was in his early 20s he resigned his commission in the Prussian army and abandoned himself, in Robert Walser's phrasing, 'to the entire catastrophe of being a poet.' [Kleist's] writings are battlegrounds across which swarm the forces of doubt, paradox and psychological crisis." In the words of Susan Sontag, "Walser [himself] often writes from the point of view of a casualty, of the romantic visionary imagination."

Michael Andre Bernstein argues that Walser mixed parts of his own life with "biographical motifs and textual echoes" not only of Kleist but also of Georg Büchner. Bernstein states that Walser "reinvents what happened to Kleist through the framework of Büchner's Lenz (1839), itself a fictionalized retelling of a still-earlier writer's descent into madness (J.M.R. Lenz in the late eighteenth-century). The effect is of one life-story embedded within or superimposed upon another, of individual identity destabilized through multiple, overlapping narratives."

Walser did not write the story until several years after leaving Thun himself. Walser's writing indicates that the site of Kleist's residence was open to the public in 1913, though the house was later torn down by a new owner and made private.

== Reception ==
Michael Andre Bernstein at The New Republic wrote, "'Kleist in Thun' shows Walser's mixture of passionate identification and subversive mockery at its most unsettling. He can change tones more swiftly and unexpectedly than any German writer I know." Bernstein used "Kleist in Thun" as an example to support a broader statement that Walser's "quirky power as a storyteller, the elusive interplay between the hopelessly [...] abjectly naive and the sardonically disenchanted, is utterly singular to him."

Chris Power at The Guardian wrote, "Walser's story captures both this incipient despair and the fevered compound of ecstasy and frustration involved in artistic creation. [The] exquisitely executed bathos [improves] rather than lessens the story's pitiable aspects, and brings Walser himself squarely into the frame. It draws a parallel between Kleist's tortured nature and his own while disarmingly allowing that the comparison is possibly absurd."

Ben Winch at Thresholds wrote that, "Walser, on the strength of a single story, 'Kleist in Thun', took a seat in the throne room beside [my existing influences] and threatened to have them all ejected. [...] I was dazzled. [...] Walser holds up a cracked old mirror, and gazes shyly at what he finds there. [...] Where a direct representation of Kleist’s [anguish] would merely have frightened me, Walser’s tender refraction of that dark light enlightened."

Chris Benfey at the London Review of Books called it "one of Walser’s greatest stories." Wayne Macauley at the Sydney Review of Books also called it one of Walser’s greatest stories and added, "he rides, wave by wave, like the protagonist, the inexorable series of moments towards the heartbreaking denouement. No past, no future, no great exposition: just a series of present moments, unfurling one from the next."

== Style, themes, and analysis ==
In Susan Sontag's analysis, "Kleist in Thun" is "both a self-portrait [of Walser] and [an] authoritative tour of the mental landscape of suicide-destined romantic genius. [It] depicts the precipice on the edge of which Walser lived."

Scholar and Walser-specialist Susan Bernofsky has said that "Kleist in Thun" is untypical for Walser because he writes in a voice that diverges from his usual one. Specifically he uses uncharacteristically short sentences, for example "Nice idea that. Easy enough to think up in Potsdam" when (Walser's version of) Kleist reflects on a past notion of becoming a farmer. Ben Winch similarly notes that it departs from Walser's usual stories. Winch suggested the story can serve as "the Rosetta Stone for anyone wanting to decipher Robert Walser [...] a writer whose habitual humility, I imagine, might otherwise prove baffling."

Michael Andre Bernstein criticizes the common view that the entire work simply identifies with Kleist's mental breakdown. Bernstein states that the tale is not straightforward, that the prose repeatedly suggests a marked distance from and irony toward Kleist, and that it shifts between a seamless fusion in one moment and Walser's unique skeptical voice in the next moment.

Robert Rubsam at the Cleveland Review of Books wrote that Walser "swings between rapture and despair, tears up his own writing, watches the swans. Eventually he takes ill, and his sister comes to collect him, and he has to leave his cottage by the lake, unresolved and unresolving."

Edward Docx counted Kleist in Thunamong so-called "European-German breakdown" stories, alongside Insane (novel) by Rainald Goetz, or The Clown by Heinrich Böll, or Homo Faber by Max Frisch.

=== Kleist, Walser, and Kafka ===
Scholars have discussed a sequential connection between Kleist, Walser, and Kafka that has been called an "uncommonly neat pattern of influence" by Chris Power (i.e. easy to prove from clear records). Susan Sontag argued that Walser is the missing link between Kleist and Kafka. Kafka was known to admire Walser's work, and considered Kleist one of his four "true blood-relations" in art. Critic Robert Rubsam argues that Kleist's work in the book Anecdotes has the humor and ironic wit that was later extended by "acolytes" Kafka and Walser into "an entire style." Christopher Benfey has identified the Kleist - Walser - Kafka connection as an "outlaw tradition running alongside, and frequently in resistance to, the 'official' German progression from Goethe and Schiller to Rilke and Mann."

== Legacy ==
W.G. Sebald, who often stated a spiritual kinship with Walser, named his 1998 essay collection Logis in einem Landhaus (i.e. Lodging in a Countryhouse) after a phrase in Walser's "Kleist in Thun."

Actor Gabriele Heller created a staged reading of "Kleist in Thun" at Newcastle University.

Musician Eric Shanfield created a short symphony analog for "Kleist in Thun" in 2025.
