= George Avery =

George Avery may refer to:

- Gordon George Avery (1925–2006), Australian track and field athlete
- George Avery (professor) (1926–2004), American professor of German Studies
- George Avery Young (1866–1900), English sportsman who played rugby and cricket
- George Sherman Avery Jr. (1903–1994), American horticulturalist

== See also ==
- George Every (1909–2003), British historian and theologian
