= The Assistant (Walser novel) =

1908 novel by Robert Walser

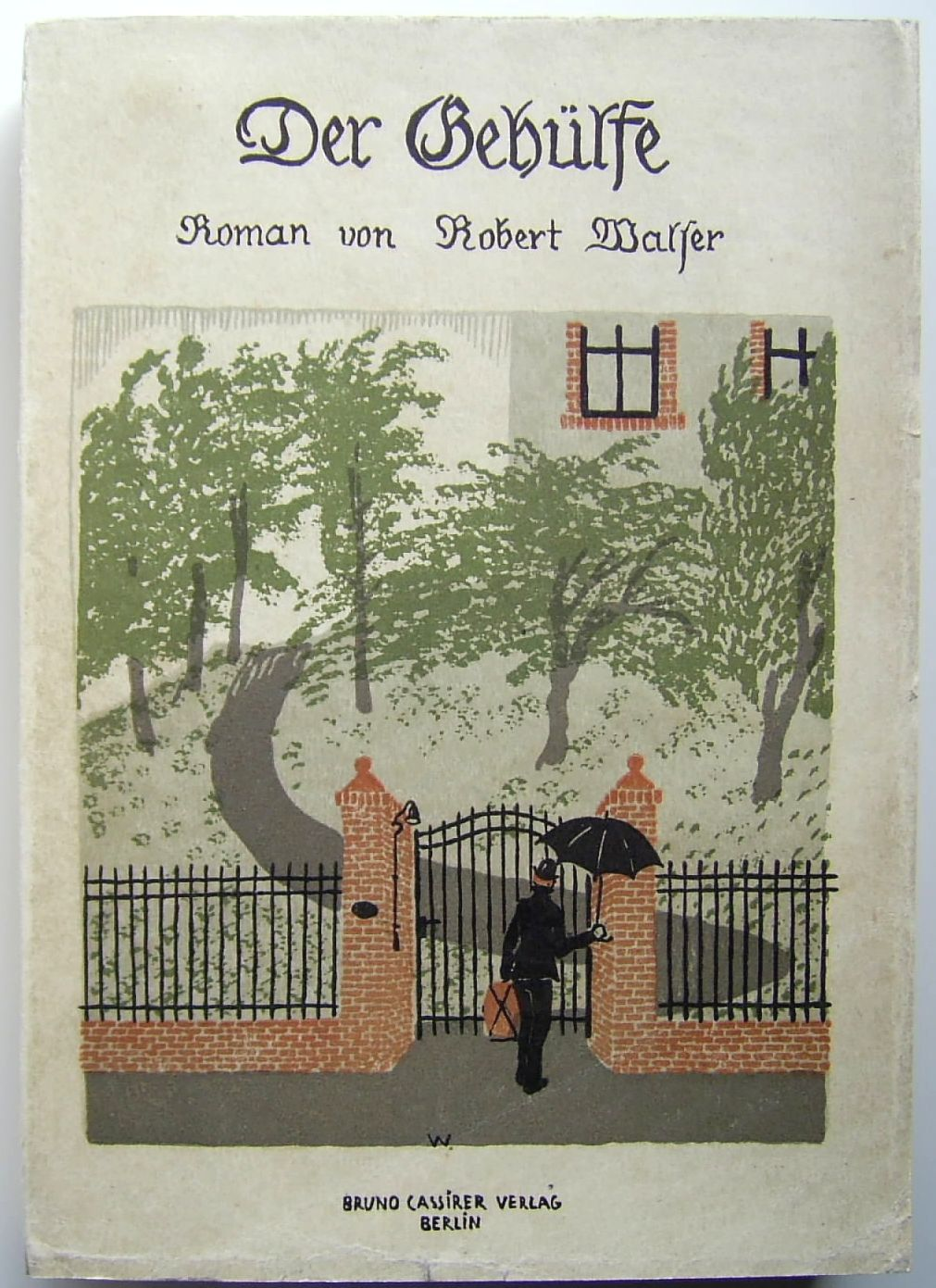
- Cover art by Karl Walser
- Author: Robert Walser
- Original title: Der Gehülfe
- Translator: Susan Bernofsky
- Language: German
- Publisher: Verlag Bruno Cassirer
- Publication date: 1908
- Publication place: Germany
- English publication date: 2007

The Assistant (German: Der Gehülfe) is a 1908 novel by the Swiss writer Robert Walser. It is about an aimless man who becomes the assistant of an eccentric Swiss inventor. The story is loosely autobiographical and based on Walser's experience as assistant to the engineer Carl Dubler in Wädenswil from the end of July 1903 to the beginning of January 1904.

The novel was adapted into the 1976 film The Assistant directed by Thomas Koerfer. In 2025, Polish artists Anka and Wilhelm Sasnal released a new feature-length adaptation of the novel.

== Background ==
As scholar Simon Wortham explains, "The Assistant (1908) [...] reflects Walser’s experiences working at the Villa of the Evening Star in Wädenswil as an assistant to the engineer and inventor Carl Dubler-Grässle." The book was written while Walser lived in Berlin.

== Reception ==
Christopher Byrd at The Believer wrote that the plot won't surprise readers but that the sentences will. Byrd also wrote, "Walser satirizes [the] quintessential predicament of the bourgeoisie, [but] there is a delicacy to his activity. One gathers that the author’s reproof against the foibles of keeping up appearances is offset by his awareness that a reprieve from struggle is [temporary]. [...] His characters [...] retain their humanity, even when their actions are unjust [...]."

John McCormick in the Sewanee Review said, "Freudian psychology has made no mark on Walser's characters," and also wondered if the text reflected John Locke's or Heinrich Von Kleist's philosophies. McCormick said Walser has "none of the features of the genuine philosphical novel, that of Cervantes or Fielding or Tolstoy", thought that passages were conveyed by the pathetic fallacy, and claimed that Walser has an "amateurish grasp" of ambiguity.

Translator Mark Harman called Bernofsky's translation excellent.

== Publication History ==
Note: this list is not complete

- 1908 - First edition published by Cassierer Verlag in Berlin
- 1936 - A re-print in a collected works edition organized by Carl Seelig
- 1969 - English translation by Michael Bullock, published by Calder and Boyars
- 2007 - English translation by Susan Bernofsky, New York, New Directions Press
