= Selected Stories (Robert Walser short story collection) =

1982 short story collection by Robert Walser

- Author: Robert Walser
- Translator: Christopher Middleton
- Language: English
- Publisher: Farrar, Straus and Giroux
- Publication date: 1982
- Publication place: United States
- Media type: Print
- Pages: 196 (NYRB edition)

Selected Stories is a 1982 English-language collection of 42 short stories, feuilletons, and prose pieces by the Swiss author Robert Walser. The pieces are translated by Christopher Middleton and others, and date from the years 1907 to 1929. The book was first published by Farrar, Straus, and Giroux in 1982 and later re-published in 2002 by New York Review Books.

== Background ==
The selections date from about 1905 to the mid 1920's, and most pieces were previously published in German in periodicals during Walser's lifetime. Scholar and translator Christopher Middleton stated that the selection aims to present some of the "main lines, or radiations, of [Walser's] power of invention in the miniature, of his charm in the grotesque, also of his ironic reflexivity, [...] his jazzy oscillations between levels of discourse--dense and transparent, straight and mocking." Middleton has said that Walser excelled in the field of short prose and that he was "at its best in miniature fictions with a rapid pulse, [...] sketches, soliloquies, improvisations, arabesques, and capriccios."

Selected Stories includes all four pieces that previously appeared in Middleton's 1957 Walser collection The Walk and Other Stories published by Calder Publishing.

=== Influence ===
In the analysis of Samuel Frederick, Selected Stories created a "new phase" of interest about Walser in the English-speaking world and placed him within broad international attention. Two reasons for the book becoming crucial were that Farrar, Straus, and Giroux was a much larger publisher than Walser's previous English-language publisher Calder Publishing, and the foreword was written by the renowned public intellectual Susan Sontag.

Sontag's introduction, published in the 1982 edition and later versions, contains influential phrasings and analysis about Walser, and is often quoted in Walser media coverage. In the foreword, Sontag described Walser:

[...]
A Paul Klee in prose--as delicate, as sly, as haunted. [...] Walser's [work is] charged with compassion: awareness of the creatureliness of life, of the fellowship of sadness. [...] As literature's present [...] remakes its past, we cannot help but see Walser as the missing link between Kleist and Kafka, who admired him greatly. [...] At the time [of Walser's writing], it was more likely to be Kafka [who was understood] through the prism of Walser. Robert Musil, another admirer among Walser's contemporaries, when he first read Kafka pronounced [him] "a peculiar case of the Walser type." The moral core of Walser's art is the refusal of power; of domination. [...] Walser's virtues are those of the most mature, most civilized art. He is truly a wonderful, heartbreaking writer."

— Excerpt from the foreword by Susan Sontag, 1982

== Reception ==
Noted scholar and translator Mark Harman wrote in a 1983 review at The German Quarterly that the book "heralds the belated discovery in this country [USA] of an innovative Swiss writer." Harman also said that Walser takes "mischievous delight in stylistic dissonance" and that Middleton's translation is so good that the reader forgets at times that it's a translation. (Note: Harman notes that recent media coverage (around the 1980's) had discussed Walser including in Vogue, Time Magazine, and Newsweek.)

In a 1982 review at Time Magazine, Paul Gray wrote that the stories "convey a sensibility that was well ahead of its time" and sometimes have a Beckett-like style a half-century before Beckett. Gray believed that "Walser’s apocalyptic vision stole a march on the many literary ones that were to follow in this century. So did he also help invent what later became a modernist stereotype: the passive, clerkly man who must find ways of passing time while waiting for the end."

In a review for PN Review in 1983, John Pilling wrote that there were three contemporaries of Kafka described as Kafka-like (Walser, Bruno Schulz, and Alfred Kubin), that all of them are diminished by the comparison, and that Walser was the most talented of the three.

== Publication History ==
- 1982 - First edition by Farrar, Straus, and Giroux
- 2002 - Paperback edition by New York Review Books. The re-print has a slightly different pagination.

== Translators ==
Most of the pieces were translated by Christopher Middleton, with 8 by Tom Whalen and Carol Gehrig working as a team, two translations credited to Tom Whalen alone, and one by Harriett Watts.

== Pieces Included ==
- "Response to a Request" (1907)
- "Flower Days" (Note: About Cornflower Day, a holiday occasion when people wear blue. The blue cornflower is the national flower of Germany.)
- "Trousers"*
- "Two Strange Stories"
- "Balloon Journey"
- "Kleist in Thun"
- "The Job Application"
- "The Boat"
- "A Little Ramble"
- "Helbling's Story"
- "The Little Berliner" (1914) (Note: Translated by Harriett Watts and published in Delos in 1968. In this short story, a 12-year old girl narrates her opinions, contemplations, and recent events in her family life.)
- "Nervous"
- "The Walk"
- "So! I've Got You"
- "Nothing At All"
- "Kienast"
- "Poets"
- "Frau Wilke"
- "The Street (I)
- "Snowdrops"
- "Winter"
- "The She-Owl"
- "The Knocking"
- "Titus"
- "Vladimir"
- "Parisian Newspapers"
- "The Monkey"
- "Dostoevsky's 'Idiot'"
- "Am I Demanding?"
- "The Little Tree"
- "Stork and Hedgehog"
- "A Contribution to the Celebration of the Conrad Ferdinand Meyer"
- "A Sort of Speech"
- "A Letter to Therese Breitbatch" (Note: This piece partly recounts a situation where Walser was invited to a literary reading but was discriminated against apparently because of his Swiss accent.) (1925)
- "A Village Tale"
- "The Aviator"
- "The Pimp"
- "Masters and Workers"
- "Essay on Freedom" (1928)
- "A Biedermeier Story"
- "The Honeymoon"
- "Thoughts on Cezanne" (1929)
