= Inner Workings: Literary Essays, 2000–2005 =

Book by John Maxwell Coetzee

- First edition
- Author: J. M. Coetzee
- Publisher: Harvill Secker
- Publication date: 2007

Inner Workings: Literary Essays, 2000–2005 is a series of 21 essays by the South African-born Nobel Prize winner J. M. Coetzee. Coetzee originally published sixteen of the essays in The New York Review of Books and four as introductions to texts.

Writers discussed in this collection include Italo Svevo, Robert Walser, Robert Musil, Walter Benjamin, Bruno Schulz, Joseph Roth, Sándor Márai, Paul Celan, Günter Grass, W. G. Sebald, Hugo Claus, Graham Greene, Samuel Beckett, Walt Whitman, William Faulkner, Saul Bellow, Arthur Miller, Philip Roth, Nadine Gordimer, Gabriel García Márquez, and V. S. Naipaul.
