= The Robber (novel) =

1925/1972 novel by Robert Walser

- Cover painting by Karl Walser
- Author: Robert Walser
- Original title: Die Räuber
- Translator: Susan Bernofsky
- Language: German
- Publication date: 1972
- Publication place: West Germany
- English publication date: March 2000
- Pages: 191

The Robber (German: Die Räuber) is a novel by the Swiss writer Robert Walser, written in 1925 and published posthumously in 1972. It is about an idle and maladjusted man who appears to have commissioned the novel's narrator to write about his life in Bern and failures with women. The text is full of digressions with little relation to the plot.

== Background ==
The novel was one of the manuscripts Walser wrote in a miniature abbreviation-coded script, a smaller variation of Kurrent, which were found after his death. The entire novel was written on 24 manuscript pages. The Robber was found untitled and is assumed to never have been intended for publication by its author. It was first transcribed and published by Jochen Greven.

The story includes several mentions of Walther Rathenau, a minister of Weimar Germany and an acquaintance of Walser, which caused Susan Bernofsky to date the novel's composition to 1922. Walser discusses Rathenau's assassination multiple times in the story and at one point to Rathanau being "properly avenged."

== Style and Themes ==
Scholar S. Frederick analyzed the novel's style in a broader study on digressions in European literature:

The apparent story in Walser’s work is [...] lost in a barrage of [...] narratorial reflection or abandoned [in] thematic promiscuity. [...] The Robber is one of the most outrageously eccentric and utterly aberrant artifacts of modernism, a cultural phenomenon already famous for its celebration of [...] the unconventional. [...] It skirts the boundaries of its own form, moving forward without ever really progressing, almost succumbing to its own digressive mania. The Robber is a work of nearly unrelenting asides, a novel that sacrifices story in its onslaught of hesitations, prolepses, deliberations, non sequiturs, meta-commentary, retractions, contradictions, exhausting inattentiveness, apologies and a seemingly limitless supply of other dilatory tactics.

— Scholar S. Frederick on The Robber

In scholar and translator Susan Bernofsky's analysis: "The novel showcases many of the idiosyncrasies of Walser's late prose: sudden shifts and leaps of perspective, interruptions of the narrative line, comically extended metaphors, and mutually exclusive or excessively relativized statements. [These] techniques [...] challenge literature's mimetic function, its ability to correspond to and represent the world. Like his contemporaries Gertrude Stein, Virginia Woolf, and James Joyce, Walser understood the extent to which language creates its own realty. His mutations of [...] German syntax often climax in breathtakingly multiclaused sentences that by a sort of linguistic hopscotch enter a [...] metaphysical space." Bernofsky identified Stendhal, Dante, Dostoevsky, Jeremias Gotthelf, Henri Rousseau, and Walther Rathenau as influences on the novel.

Bernofsky has also written that it's "generally comic in tone but is a highly serious study of the modern fragmented self and the role of the writer in society." She describes the novel as a mixture of "love story, tragedy, and farce, [mostly about] a main character who bungles his way through a number of comically traumatic adventures." Bernofsky has also said that the main character "lends his role dignity by describing himself through the fictional eyes of his own invention." Cigdem Asatekin at The Brooklyn Rail wrote that Walser uses a third-person narration yet allows the narrator to intervene in the first-person with Walserian characteristics.

W.G. Sebald wrote of The Robber, "Walser accrues insights into his own particular state of mind and the nature of mental disturbance [in a way that is] found nowhere else in literature. With seismographic precision he registers the slightest tremors at the edges of his consciousness, records rejections and ripples in his thoughts and emotions of which the science of psychiatry even today scarcely allows itself to dream." Sebald also argues that Walser's energy in the book comes from the "outermost brink" under threat of annihilation from the rise of naziism.

The Robber is far more stylistically complex than Walser's earlier works and the only novel-length example of Walser’s late period experimental style.

== Reception ==
Kirkus Reviews called Walser a "Swiss German master" and wrote that The Robber is a "charmingly goofy display of one of the most liberating of all modern literary imaginations."

J.M. Coetzee wrote that the novel's "charm lies in its surprising twists and turns of direction, delicately ironic handling of the formulas of amatory play, and supple and inventive exploitation of the resources of German" and that "the story [itself] is light to the point of being insubstantial." W.G. Sebald wrote, "Der Räuber is Walser’s most rational and most daring work, a self-portrait and self-examination of absolute integrity, in which both the compiler of the medical history and his subject [are] the author."

Josef Schmidt in the International Fiction Review praised Bernofsky's English translation and wrote, "Walser spares his silent reader no effort to follow his dazzling train of thought. He is a causeur par excellence, and, like his intellectual cousin Walter Benjamin, [is] the perfect "flaneur." Schmidt wrote that Walser treats readers to unique word usages, creations, and hapax legomenon.

William H. Gass wrote that The Robber is "one of the true wonders of the European fictional world. If you are fond of pleasure postponed, of insertions, digressions, concealments, [...], this maze will amaze you. [Bernofsky's] translation has caught it all: you will scratch your head, you will laugh out loud."

== Cover ==
The painting used for the cover is titled "Nach Natur" (1894) by Karl Walser and depicts Robert dressed as the hero Karl Moor of Friedrich Schiller's play The Robbers.
