= George Avery (professor) =

American academic in German literature

- Born: Philadelphia, Pennsylvania
- Died: March 5, 2004; Chester, Pennsylvania

Academic background
- Education: University of Pennsylvania

Academic work
- Discipline: German studies
- Institutions: Swarthmore College; Saint Joseph's University

George Avery (July 27, 1926 – March 5, 2004) was an American professor of German Studies at Swarthmore College.

== Life ==
After a temporary teaching engagement at St. Joseph's University, Avery was hired by Swarthmore in 1959 and taught there until his retirement. He served as Chair of the Department of Modern Languages from 1975 to 1980. His student, Jonathan Franzen, portrayed Avery's manner of teaching in his memoirs.

== Research ==
Avery specialized in German literature of the twentieth century, be it German, Swiss, or Austrian in origin. He published monographs and scholarly editions on the work of Robert Walser, Herwarth Walden and Karl Kraus. Avery received international recognition for his "pioneering study" on Walser. Andreas Kramer noted Avery's "meticulous notes and his commented index" regarding the correspondence between Karl Kraus and Herwath Walden, concluding that "Avery's edition [...] substantially contributes to our understanding of the wider cultural and social context of the German and Austrian avant-garde before 1914."

== Books ==
- Feinde in Scharen: Ein wahres Vergnügen dazusein. Karl Kraus, Herwarth Walden Briefwechsel 1909–1912 (Veröffentlichungen der Deutschen Akademie für Sprache und Dichtung Darmstadt 79, Göttingen 2002).
- Inquiry and Testament. A Study of the Novels and Short Prose of Robert Walser (Philadelphia 1968).
- A Poet Beyond the Pale. Some Notes on the Shorter Works of Robert Walser (s. l. 1963).
