= Selected Stories =

Short story collection by Alice Munro

- First edition cover
- Author: Alice Munro
- Publisher: Alfred A. Knopf
- Publication date: October 1, 1996
- ISBN: 0-679-44627-3

Selected Stories (later republished as A Wilderness Station: Selected Stories, 1968–1994) is a volume of short stories by Canadian writer Alice Munro, published by McClelland and Stewart in 1996. The book collects stories from Munro's seven previous short story collections. Upon its release, reviewers generally praised the book's writing style, detail and emotions.

== Background ==
The book collects stories from seven of Munro's eight previously published books as of the time of its original publication; her only book not represented in Selected Stories was her novel Lives of Girls and Women.

== Stories ==
- "Walker Brothers Cowboy"
- "Dance of the Happy Shades"
- "Postcard"
- "Images"
- "Something I've Been Meaning to Tell You"
- "The Ottawa Valley"
- "Material"
- "Royal Beatings"
- "Wild Swans"
- "The Beggar Maid"
- "Simon's Luck"
- "Chaddeleys and Flemings I: The Connection"
- "Chaddeleys and Flemings II: The Stone in the Field"
- "Dulse"
- "The Turkey Season"
- "Labor Day Dinner"
- "The Moons of Jupiter"
- "The Progress of Love"
- "Lichen"
- "Miles City, Montana"
- "White Dump"
- "Fits"
- "Friend of My Youth"
- "Meneseteung"
- "Differently"
- "Carried Away"
- "The Albanian Virgin"
- "A Wilderness Station"
- "Vandals"

== Reception ==
A review from The Globe and Mail praised the book as an excellent introduction to Munro's work, as its chronological arrangement offers the ability to observe the evolution of her writing style and thematic focus over the course of her career. Selected Stories also received a starred review from Publishers Weekly, which described the book as a "literature-lover's feast" and the stories as "trenchant, finely modulated and truly brilliant meditations on peoples' complexities and the emotions they contend with--sometimes ruefully, sometimes in pain, but most often with stoic dignity". Kirkus also stated that the stories were "compact and resonant". James Wood from The London Review of Books also praised the comic detail of the stories, describing some as "delicate". He also complimented the portrayal of communities as realistic and the characters' "self-calibrations and self-protectiveness of small towns against themselves". However, Wood was more critical to the prose, which was "not lavish: it is intelligently starved; not sticky with metaphor, or crowded with detail" but occasionally disappointing.
