= Mark Harman (translator) =

Irish-American translator

Mark Harman (born 1951) is an Irish-American literary translator, most notably of Franz Kafka's work, and professor emeritus of German and English at Elizabethtown College, Pennsylvania.

== Life and education ==
A native of Dublin, Harman studied at University College Dublin and Yale University, where he took his BA/MA and PhD, respectively.

== Career ==
He has taught German and Irish literature at Dartmouth, Oberlin, Franklin & Marshall, and the University of Pennsylvania. He is also a freelance translator for many newspapers and scholarly journals.

=== Kafka translations ===
Harman gained public recognition for his 1998 translation of Franz Kafka's The Castle, for which he won the Lois Roth Award of the Modern Language Association. As a translator, Harman wrote, "Translation is a complex issue, and retranslation doubly so," referencing the double challenge to confront both the text in the original and in other translations. Harman has characterized the current moment as a "great era for retranslation" to reexamine the versions through which generations of English-speakers have encountered important works from other tongues. Harman discusses his translation in a preface to his translation of The Castle.

His translation of Kafka's Amerika: The Missing Person, more widely known as Amerika, was published in 2008. His translation of selected stories by Kafka was published in 2024.

=== Other translations and works ===
Harman is also the translator of Soul of the Age: Selected Letters of Hermann Hesse 1891-1962 (1991, edited by Theodore Ziolkowski).

In The New York Review of Books, John Banville wrote that Harman's "elegant new translation" of Rilke's Letters to a Young Poet was "likely to become the standard one".

Harman edited the 1985 volume Robert Walser Rediscovered: Stories, Fairy-Tale Plays, and Critical Responses and also served as co-translator for several included works. Reviews appeared in The German Quarterly, South Atlantic Review, and Colloquia Germanica.

=== Scholarly reviews ===
Harman has also reviewed work by other translators in scholarly journals, for example in a 1983 issue of The German Quarterly he reviewed Christopher Middleton's work on Robert Walser in Selected Stories. In 2008, he reviewed the Walser collection Speaking to the Rose

== Awards ==
- 1998 - Lois Roth Award of the Modern Language Association

== Works ==
Note: the lists below are incomplete.

=== Translations ===
- Hermann Hesse, Soul of the Age (1991, edited by Theodore Ziolkowski), a volume of selected letters by Hermann Hesse
- The Castle by Franz Kafka (Schocken Books, 1998)
- Amerika: The Missing Person by Franz Kafka (Schocken Books 2008) ISBN 978-0-8052-4211-9
- Franz Kafka: Selected Stories, translated and edited by Mark Harman. (The Belknap Press of Harvard University Press, 2024)
- Letters to a Young Poet by Rainer Maria Rilke (Harvard University Press, 2011)

=== Editor ===
- Robert Walser Rediscovered: Stories, Fairy-Tale Plays, & Critical Response Including the Anti-Fairy Tales, Cinderella & Snow White by (University Press of New England, 1985)ISBN 0-87451-334-0
