= Susan Bernofsky =

American translator (born 1966)

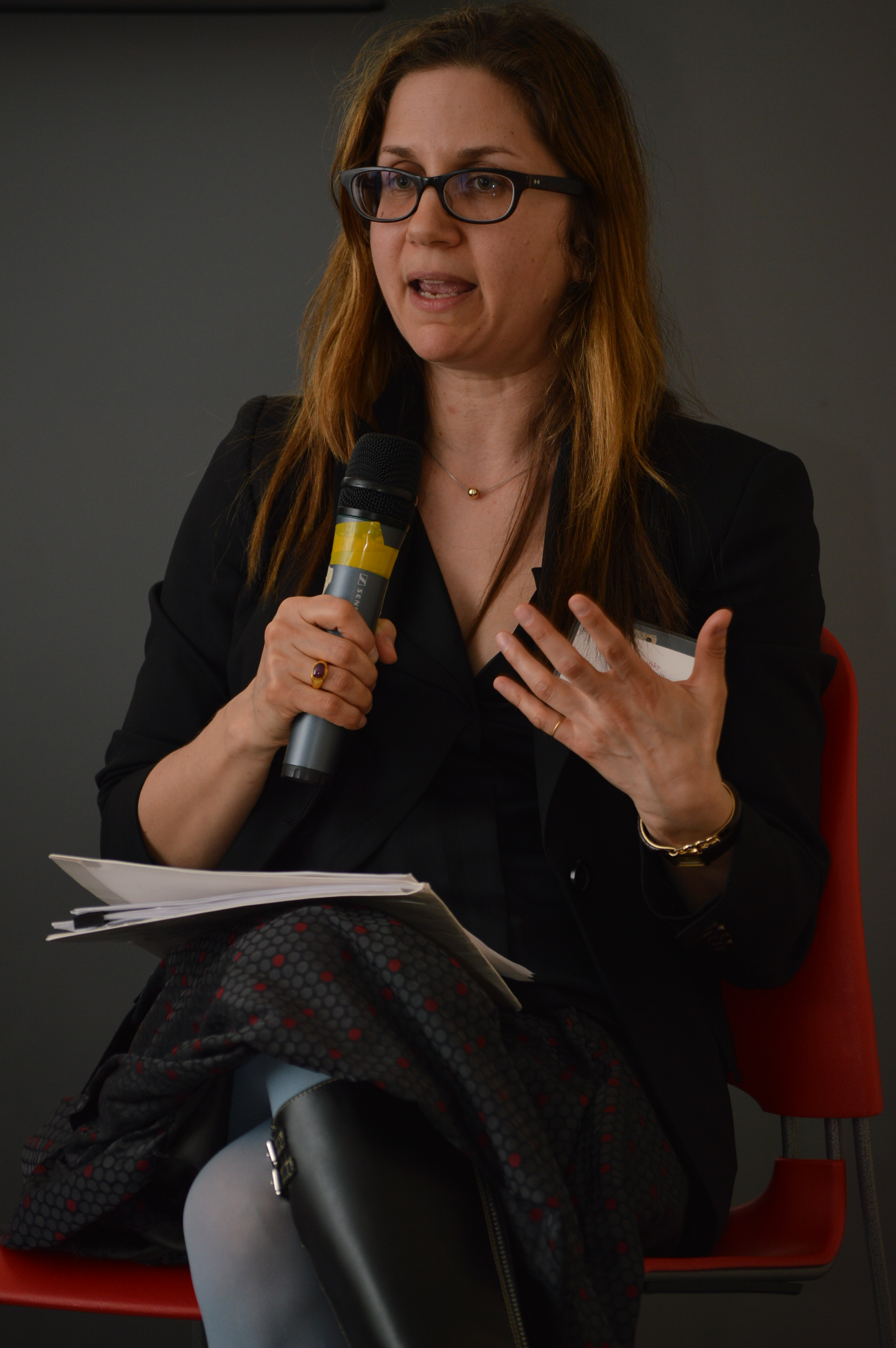
- Susan Bernofsky speaking at swissnex San Francisco on April 3, 2013
- Born: July 20, 1966 (age 60); Cleveland
- Education: Washington University; Princeton University

Susan Bernofsky (born 1966) is an American translator of German-language literature and author.

== Life and work ==
Susan Bernofsky is best known for bringing the Swiss writer Robert Walser to the attention of the English-speaking world (in a "second wave" after the work of Christopher Middleton), translating many of his books and writing his biography. She has also translated several books by Jenny Erpenbeck and Yoko Tawada. She holds an MFA in Fiction from Washington University in St. Louis and a PhD in Comparative Literature from Princeton University. Her prizes for translation include the 2006 Helen and Kurt Wolff Translator's Prize, the 2012 Calw Hermann Hesse Prize, the 2015 Oxford-Weidenfeld Translation Prize, the 2015 Independent Foreign Fiction Prize, and the 2015 Schlegel-Tieck Prize. She was also selected for a Guggenheim Fellowship in 2014. In 2017, she won the Warwick Prize for Women in Translation for her translation of Memoirs of a Polar Bear by Yoko Tawada. In 2018 she was awarded the MLA's Lois Roth Award for her translation of Go, Went, Gone by Jenny Erpenbeck. In 2024, Bernofsky was reported to be working on a translation of Thomas Mann's The Magic Mountain.

She teaches at Columbia University. In April 2024, she was one of 23 Jewish professors at Columbia (including six Barnard College professors) to sign an open letter to Columbia president Minouche Shafik, calling congressional investigations of antisemitism on university campuses "a new McCarthyism" intended "to rehearse and amplify decades-long bad-faith efforts to undermine universities as sites of learning, critical thinking, and knowledge production" and alleging a widespread effort to silence "Palestinian narratives and analyses on campus." The letter she signed declared that "today’s attacks on the university [because of alleged climate hostile to Jewish and Israeli students] are not truly about antisemitism." A shorter version of this letter was published in the Columbia Daily Spectator.

In April 2024, she defended student protesters at Columbia University who were calling for an end to Israel’s war in Gaza and for divestment from companies supplying it with military-related products.

== Books ==
- Clairvoyant of the Small: The Life of Robert Walser (Yale University Press, 2021)
  - Finalist, National Book Critics Circle Award for Biography
- In Translation: Translators on Their Work and What It Means (co-editor with Esther Allen, Columbia University Press, 2013)

== Translations ==
=== Robert Walser ===
- Looking at Pictures (2015)
- The Walk (2012)
- Berlin Stories (2012)
- Microscripts (2010)
- The Tanners (2009)
- The Assistant (2007)
- The Robber (2000)
- Masquerade and Other Stories (1990)

=== Jenny Erpenbeck ===
- The Old Child and Other Stories
- The Book of Words
- Visitation
- The End of Days
- Go, Went, Gone

=== Yoko Tawada ===
- Memoirs of a Polar Bear
- The Naked Eye
- Where Europe Begins
- Paul Celan and the Trans-Tibetan Angel, New Directions Publishing, July 9, 2024, ISBN 9780811234870

=== Selected others ===
- The Metamorphosis (W.W. Norton & Company, 2014) by Franz Kafka
- Perpetual Motion by Paul Scheerbart
- The Magic Flute (Mozart opera libretto) by Emanuel Schikaneder commissioned by director Isaac Mizrahi for the Opera Theatre of St. Louis
- The Black Spider (New York Review Books, 2013) by Jeremias Gotthelf
- False Friends by Uljana Wolf
- Siddhartha (Modern Library, 2006) by Hermann Hesse
- Celan Studies by Peter Szondi
- The Trip to Bordeaux by Ludwig Harig
- Anecdotage: A Summation (Farrar Straus Giroux, 1996) by Gregor von Rezzori
