= Max Rychner =

- Born: April 8, 1897; Lichtensteig, Switzerland
- Died: June 10, 1965 (aged 68); Zurich
- Occupations: writer, journalist, translator, and literary critic
- Writing career
- Language: German
- Notable awards: Gottfried-Keller-Preis

Max Rychner (8 April 1897 in Lichtensteig, Switzerland – 10 June 1965 in Zurich) - was a Swiss writer, journalist, translator, and literary critic, writing in German. Hannah Arendt called him "[O]ne of the most educated and subtle figures in the intellectual life of the era"

Rychner published several books of poetry, short stories, essays, and autobiographical prose, and translated some of the works of Paul Valéry into German. For several decades, he was one of the most influential literary critics and reviewers writing in German. He admired, promoted, and published the works of Robert Walser, and corresponded with Hugo von Hofmannsthal, Thomas Mann, Gottfried Benn, Ernst Robert Curtius, and others.

He championed the young poet Paul Celan and published the memoirs of Walter Benjamin.

In 1956, Rychner won the Gottfried Keller Award.

== Published works ==
- Bei mir laufen Fäden zusammen. Literarische Aufsätze, Kritiken, Briefe. Literarische Aufsätze, Kritiken, Briefe. Göttingen: Wallstein Verlag, 1998 Göttingen: Wallstein Verlag, 1998 (in German)
