= Causerie =

Literary style of short informal essays

Causerie (from French, "talk, chat") is a literary style of short informal essays mostly unknown in the English-speaking world. A causerie is generally short, light and humorous and is often published as a newspaper column (although it is not defined by its format). Often the causerie is a current-opinion piece, and it may contain more verbal acrobatics and humor than a regular opinion or column. In English, causerie is commonly known as "personal story", "talk of the town", "funny story" or "column" instead.

The causerie style is characterized by a personal approach to the reader; the writer "babbles" to the reader, from which the term derives. Language jokes, hyperbole, intentional disregard of linguistic and stylistic norms, and other absurd or humorous elements are permitted. For example, in a causerie about a politician, they may be placed in an imagined situation. Sentences are usually kept short, avoiding over-explaining, and room is left for the reader to read between the lines.

The content of causerie is not limited and it may be satire, parody, opinion, factual or straight fiction. Causerie is not defined by content or format, but style. Although usually published in a newspaper, many authors have published anthologies. The causerie as a form became popular in the English-speaking world during the later nineteenth century following the widely published and influential essays of Andrew Lang.

== See also ==
- Feuilleton
- Stanton Delaplane

== Notes ==
Footnotes

Donaldson, William (2004). Oxford Dictionary of National Biography. Oxford University Press.
