= Thomas Whalen =

Thomas Whalen may refer to:

- Thomas Michael Whalen III, American attorney and politician, mayor of Albany, New York
- Thomas Whalen (sculptor), Scottish sculptor
- Tom Whalen (footballer), Scottish footballer
