= Berlin Stories (Walser short story collection) =

2012 short story collection by Robert Walser translated by Susan Bernofsky

- Cover
- Author: Robert Walser
- Translator: Susan Bernofsky
- Language: English
- Publisher: The New York Review of Books
- Publication date: 2012
- Publication place: United States
- Media type: Print
- Pages: 139

Berlin Stories is a 2012 English-language collection of 38 feuilletons, short stories, and prose pieces by the Swiss author Robert Walser. The included works were originally written and published in the 1900s and treat Berlin as the subject matter. Most of the pieces are translated by Susan Bernofsky, with a small number translated by Christopher Middleton and Harriett Watts.

In the words of Bernofsky, the pieces create "a city portrait of [...] bustling streets, technology-fueled haste, social and artistic striving, and a certain melting-pot quality seen above all in the public parks where many levels of society intersect."

== Background ==
The included prose works were chosen and organized by Jochen Greven (1932–2012), a German scholar and long-time editor of Walser's German publications, from among a larger set of about 120 Berlin-relevant pieces by Walser.

Walser moved to Berlin in 1905 at age 27 soon after publishing his first prose book, Fritz Kocher's Essays in 1904. Berlin's thriving art scene was a destination of German-language writers and artists, and Robert's older brother Karl had already moved there. After living in Berlin for seven years and then moving back to Switzerland, Walser called himself "ridiculed and unsuccessful."

=== Format and genre ===
Walser called most of his short (non-verse) works "prose pieces", which includes a mixture of fiction, historical fiction, non-fictional descriptions, and observational memoir-like musings. His common format of short pieces has been called "literary snapshots" of urban and social spaces, and "hybrids of story and essay." Many of the pieces in this collection were published as feuilletons or in literary magazines.

== Reception ==
Nicholas Lezard at The Guardian wrote, "in this unbelievably delightful and timeless collection of short pieces, we can recover the delight of ordinary, uncondescending appreciation, [at] places where the vacant-minded stroller can take 'peculiar pleasure' including the tram, the theatre, the train station, the park." Lezard suggested that the judgment of a reader will depend on the serenity of their disposition.

Mary Hawthorne at The New Yorker wrote in a review, "Whether he is observing an Abyssinian lion in the zoo, or complaining about pompous, self-important people, or thinking about a park, or observing a play, or assessing the character of the city street, it is always the quality of mind that holds us rapt."

Andrew Naffis-Sahely at The Independent wrote that when Walser "forgets himself" the "result is outstanding" and called "Frau Wilke" masterful. Naffis-Sahely singled out "The Little Berliner", in which "an upper-class 12-year-old girl voices her unintentionally hilarious opinions on her city, her Papa, and her privileged vision of the world." He added that the collection doesn't leave a lasting impression of Berlin specifically and that the observations in the writing could apply to any city.

Christopher Ohge at Artfuse wrote, "Walser’s unsullied, alien eye [as an outsider] captured the unstable shifting identity and landscape (in the final days of the Kaiser Wilhelm II’s regime) as they were in motion." Ohge praised Walser's aphoristic style as "filled with vigor" and said said his teasing critiques of the Berlin theater scene are "often uproarious." He praised Bernofsky's talent for conveying Walser's "nimble sense of humor" and difficult compound German words in English.

A crowd survey response chosen for publication by The Guardian discussed enjoying Berlin Stories and noted that fragments are Walser's specialty. They also said, “[Walser] takes great pleasure in simple things: like taking a walk on Market day, or stuffing his face at a sort of German pub, or breathing in the musty smell of a room that hasn’t been lived in."

== Pieces Included ==
The groupings below follow the section titles in the book. Pieces are translated by Susan Bernofsky except in three cases where otherwise noted.

=== The City Streets ===
- "Good Morning, Giantess!" (1907)
- "The Park"
- "Friedrichstrasse" (1907)
- "Market"
- "Aschinger" (Note: A short piece about a rapid service chain restaurant which was a new advent at a time when mass transit allowed an unprecedented number of people to arrive at and pass through areas of the city quickly. Berlin's first subway opened in 1902)
- "The Metropolitan Street"
- "Berlin W"
- "Tiergarten" (1911)
- "In the Electric Tram" (1908)
- "The Metropolitan Street"

=== The Theater ===
- "The Theater, a Dream"
- "A Person of Possessed of Curiosity"
- "On the Russian Ballet" (Note: Walser discusses the Petersburg Imperial Theatre ballerinas visiting Berlin at the time, including Anna Pavlova and the current Harlequin's Millions. Walser claims the audience has a sophisticated response unlike the behavior for an Ibsen play or Wagner opera.)
- "Portrait Sketch"
- "On Staging Lies"
- "Do You Know Meier?"
- "Four Amusements" (1907) (Note: The 4 amusements are: A) a description of an apparently fictional poet "Seltmann" observed in a coffee shop; B) disappointment about the actor Gertrud Eysoldt having announced that she's changing from theatre to business shopkeeping, and about another similarly "absconding" actor Friedrich Kayssler; C) an amusing policy change concerning uniforms at the Kammerspiele theater; D) Max Reinhardt's recent idea to use only blank white backdrops in his productions.)
- "Cowshed"
- "An Actor"

=== Berlin Life ===
- "Fabulous"
- "Mountain Halls" (Note: A description of a variety show venue on Unter den Linden. Max Brod said that this story was one of Franz Kafka's favorites, and that Kafka would laugh hysterically when reading it aloud.) (1908)
- "The Little Berliner" (Note: Translated by Harriett Watts.) (Note: In this short story, a 12-year old girl narrates her opinions, contemplations, and recent events in her family life.)
- "Flower Days" (Note: Translated by Christopher Middleton) (Note: About Cornflower Day, a holiday occasion when people wear blue. The blue cornflower is the national flower of Germany.)
- "Fire"
- "Something About the Railway"
- "What Became of Me"
- "Food for Thought"

=== Looking Back ===
- "Remembering the Tales of Hoffman"
- "The Tanners"
- "The Secretary" (Note: Walser served for several months as secretary for the Berlin Secession, a group of artists who left the official Association of Berlin Artists in 1892.)
- "Frau Bahni"
- "Full" (Note: Includes the ongoing comical battle between a Berlin Omnibus driver, which was horse-drawn at the time, and crowds trying to get on when it's supposedly full.) (1916)
- "Horse and Woman"
- "Frau Wilke"
- "Frau Scheer"
- "The Millionairess"
- "A Homecoming in the Snow"

== Footnotes ==
Translators
