= Chris Power =

British writer and literary critic (born 1975)

- Born: 1975 (age 50–51)
- Education: Swansea University
- Occupations: Writer and literary critic
- Notable credit: The Guardian

Chris Power is a British writer and literary critic for The Guardian.

== Biography ==
Power was born in 1975 and grew up in Farnborough, Hampshire. He studied English and American literature at Swansea University, graduating in 1998.

He has worked as an advertising copywriter and creative director.

Power wrote a regular column for The Guardian about the short story as a literary form between 2007 and 2020. He has also presented the BBC Radio Four programme Open Book. He is a contributor to the London Review of Books and was one of the judges for the Booker Prize in 2025.

He has cited Roberto Bolaño and Denis Johnson as literary influences.

Power's first book of short stories, Mothers: Stories, was published in 2018 in Britain and in 2019 in the United States. His first novel, A Lonely Man, was published in April 2021.

Power is married with two daughters and lives in London.
