= The Tanners (novel) =

1907 novel by Robert Walser

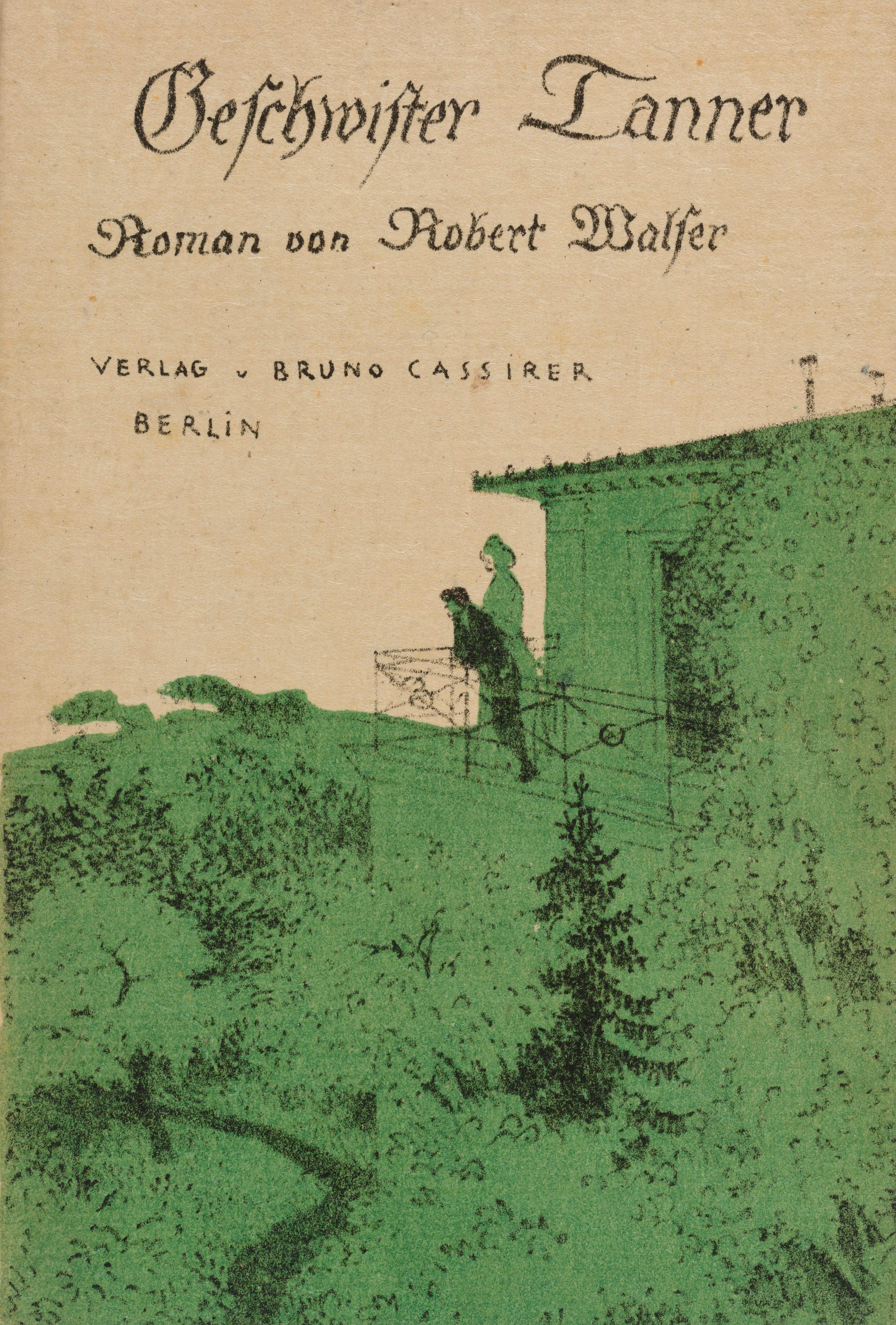
- Author: Robert Walser
- Original title: Geschwister Tanner
- Translator: Susan Bernofsky
- Language: German
- Publisher: Verlag Bruno Cassirer
- Publication date: 1907
- Publication place: Germany
- English publication date: 2009
- Pages: 319

The Tanners (German: Geschwister Tanner, lit. 'Tanner Siblings') is a 1907 novel by the Swiss writer Robert Walser. It follows the 20-year-old Simon Tanner and his family, as he struggles with dissatisfaction over a secure and orderly life and the high costs of rejecting basic human needs. It was Walser's first full-length novel.

When the book was published in English in 2009, Trinie Dalton wrote in Bookforum that it "is really about the tension between what we think and what we do, particularly when that tension produces disappointment".

== See also ==
- Flâneur
