= Carl Seelig =

German-Swiss writer and patron

Carl Seelig

Carl Seelig (May 11, 1894, Zurich – February 15, 1962, Zurich) was a German-Swiss writer and patron. He was best known as a friend, promoter and guardian of Robert Walser and the first biographer of Albert Einstein.

== Life ==
Seelig was born to Karl Wilhelm, a proprietor of a silk dye works and a mountaineer, and Julie Alwine née Kuhn. He married Maria Margareta Deutsch and later Martha Suter. He attended grammar school in Zurich and Trogen. He studied jurisprudence in Zurich, although he did not attain a degree. During the 1920s, he began writing both poetry and prose.

His later filled roles as a writer and a publisher. Seeling then began publishing independent literature as a theatre and film reviewer, editor, and author. Notably, he undertook the role of a biographer, particularly on life of Albert Einstein. Additionally, he was a supporter for authors in exile and for Robert Walser. He assumed the roles of editor, custodian, and executor for Walser, which culminated in his portrayal of him in "Wanderungen mit Robert Walser" (1957). It was translated for the first time into the English, Walks with Walser, by Anne Posten in 2017.

An international libraries overview counted 163 published works, in 294 publications and 13 languages. He also employed the pseudonym Thomas Glohn for some of his written works. Seelig's recorded correspondents were, among others, Max Brod, Hans Henny Jahnn, Alfred Polgar and Joseph Roth. He also maintained close contacts with Swiss authors, most notably Robert Walser, whom he accompanied on his walks, giving rise to the biographical work, Wanderungen mit Robert Walser,

The Swiss Literary Archives store, as a long-term loan, approximately 6,000 manuscript pieces by Seelig.

As a testament to his dedication, he played a pivotal role in establishing the Carl Seelig Foundation in 1966. Notably, this foundation underwent a name change in 2004, becoming recognized as the Robert Walser Foundation.

== Bibliography ==
=== German ===
- Der Tag bricht an. Neue Gedichte von Waldemar Bonsels, Martin Buber, Hermann Hesse, Stefan Zweig (editor, 1921)
- Das neue Wunderhorn (editor, 1924)
- Die Jahreszeyten im Spiegel schweizerischer Volkssprüche (editor, 1925)
- Robert Walser: Vom Glück des Unglücks und der Armut. Die schönsten besinnlichen Stellen aus Walsers Büchern – stille Weisheit eines wahren Poeten (editor, 1944)
- Novalis: Gesammelte Werke (editor, 1945/1946)
- Sterne: Anekdotische Kurzgeschichten aus sechs Jahrhunderten (editor, 1950)
- Robert Walser: Jakob von Gunten. (editor, 1950).
- Albert Einstein und die Schweiz (1952)
- Robert Walser: Dichtungen in Prosa (1953–1961)
- Albert Einstein (1954)
- Helle Zeit — Dunkle Zeit: In memoriam Albert Einstein (editor, 1956)
- Wanderungen mit Robert Walser (1957)
- Albert Einstein: Mein Weltbild (first published 1934 by Rudolf Kayser, extended edition published by Seelig in 1954)
- Originelle Gestalten der Familie Schoop. In: Thurgauer Jahrbuch. 33. Jahrgang, pages 95–110 (1958)
- Albert Einstein Leben Und Werk Eines Genies Unserer Zeit (1960

=== English Translations ===
- Albert Einstein: A Documentary Biography (1956)
- Ideas and Opinions by Albert Einstein (editor, translation first published 1954)
- The World as I See It (editor, translation first published 2015)
- Walks with Walser (2017)
