= List of short stories by Robert Walser =

Bibliography

This is a list of short stories, feuilletons, and prose pieces written by the Swiss author Robert Walser. It intends to include all non-novel prose works that have been translated into English and published in collections, and is organized by the date of English collection. Because Walser's short non-novel prose works do not neatly fit the common categories of short story or non-fiction, the article title uses the term "short story" only for broad convenience. (Also see: main article discussion of Walser's format and genre.)

== Notation ==
Dates. Dates for book titles in the section headers refer to the (English) book's year of publication. Dates in parentheses for listed pieces indicate the year of original publication in German or the date of composition (if unpublished in Walser's lifetime). Items below with two years refer to an earler German publication in a periodical and then a later German publication in collected book form.

Titles. Work titles with roman numerals in parentheses mean Walser wrote more than once piece with the same title. Works named with non-standard title capitalization, i.e. lowercase keywords, are works that were never titled or published in Walser's lifetime and are known by their first line.

Groupings. Header groupings below within a given book follow the section titles in the book.

== The Walk and Other Stories (1957) ==
- "Frau Wilke" (1918) First appeared in Poetenleben
- "Kleist in Thun" (1914) First appeared in Geschichten
- "The Monkey" (1925) First appeared in Die Rose
- "The Walk" (1917) First appeared in German as its own volume

== Selected Stories (1982) ==
- "Response to a Request" (1907)
- "Flower Days" (Note: About Cornflower Day, a holiday occasion when people wear blue. The blue cornflower is the national flower of Germany.)
- "Trousers"*
- "Two Strange Stories"
- "Balloon Journey" (Note: Based on a 1908 balloon trip that Walser went on with Paul Cassirer and Cassirer’s cousin Alfred who was a licensed pilot, though the story changes the characters. The real-life trip went from Berlin to Königsberg i.e. present day Kaliningrad, though the towns in the story are discussed without being named.) (1913)
- "Kleist in Thun"
- "The Job Application"
- "The Boat"
- "A Little Ramble"
- "Helbling's Story"
- "The Little Berliner" (1914) (Note: Translated by Harriett Watts and published in Delos in 1968. In this short story, a 12-year old girl narrates her opinions, contemplations, and recent events in her family life. Susan Bernofsky says the character is “transparently recognizable” as Paul Cassirer’s daughter Suzanne Aimée.)
- "Nervous"
- "The Walk"
- "So! I've Got You"
- "Nothing At All"
- "Kienast"
- "Poets"
- "Frau Wilke"
- "The Street (I)
- "Snowdrops"
- "Winter"
- "The She-Owl"
- "The Knocking"
- "Titus"
- "Vladimir"
- "Parisian Newspapers"
- "The Monkey"
- "Dostoevsky's 'Idiot'"
- "Am I Demanding?"
- "The Little Tree"
- "Stork and Hedgehog"
- "A Contribution to the Celebration of the Conrad Ferdinand Meyer"
- "A Sort of Speech"
- "A Letter to Therese Breitbatch" (Note: This piece partly recounts a situation where Walser was invited to a literary reading but was discriminated against apparently because of his Swiss accent.) (1925)
- "A Village Tale"
- "The Aviator"
- "The Pimp"
- "Masters and Workers"
- "Essay on Freedom" (1928)
- "A Biedermeier Story"
- "The Honeymoon"
- "Thoughts on Cezanne" (1929)

== Masquerade and Other Stories (1990) ==
Headers below follow the named section categories in the book.

=== Zurich (1896-1905) ===
- ”Lake Greifen” (1899)
- ”From Fritz Kocher’s Essays” (Note: Additional pieces from "Fritz Kocher's Essays" are published in A Schoolboy's Diary) (1902)

Autumn
Professions
Country Fair
Music

- ”Two Stories” (1902)

"The Genius" (Note: The genius is named Wenzel in the first line.)
"The World"

- ”Simon” (Subtitled: 'A Love Story') (1903)
- ”The Gloves” (1905)

=== Berlin (1905-1913) ===
- "Good Morning, Giantess!" (1907)
- "Comedy Evening" (1907)
- ”Aschinger” (Note: A short piece about a rapid service chain restaurant which was a new advent at a time when mass transit allowed an unprecedented flow of people through certain areas of the city quickly. Berlin's first subway opened in 1902) (1907)
- ”Mountain Halls” (Note: A description of a variety show venue on Unter den Linden. Max Brod said that this story was one of Franz Kafka's favorites, and that Kafka would laugh hysterically when reading it aloud.) (1908)
- ”Market” (1908)
- ”The Battle of Sempach” (Note: A historical fiction imagining of violent combat in the 14th century) (190*
- "Tableau Vivant" (1909)
- ”Food (I)” (Note: The "(I)" refers to this being one of several similar pieces with the same title. The first sentence is, "Veal fricandeau is frightful stuff.") (1911)

=== Biel (1913-1921) ===
- ”Johanna” (Note: The narrator describes a romance with a woman, Johanna, while he is lodging in a room at the parcel postman's, Senn, who is angry about the romance) (1913)
- ”The Violet” (Note: The narrator strolles through a park-like garden-filled villa district. A beautiful woman approaches him, but then departs. The narrator has a reverie that he met a "tall, brown-eyed, violet in the shape of a woman" who then vanishes.) (1915)
- "Marie" (Note: One of the longest Walser short prose pieces at about 14 pages. The narrator describes his residential situation, father, a "garret" lodging on the premises of a Frau Bandi, and repeated chance-meetings with a woman on a forest path. Susan Bernofsky believes that Frau Bandi is a depiction of Flora Ackeret, a longtime associate of the Walser family and whose family owned the building that Walser’s father Adolf moved into after his business declined.) (1916)
- "Fraulein Knuchel” (1917)
- ”Basta” (1917)
- ”Fritz” (Note: Somewhat similar to Fritz Kocher's Essays. The narrator talks about several subjects. Each subject is introduced with an interjection of a capital TOPIC word between paragraphs: SEMINARY, ROME, AMSTERDAM (the narrator diverts in this section to brief mention of Pisa, Ravenna, Palace of Theodoric, and Venice), ZURICH, THURINGIA, BERLIN, LADY, POSITION OF TRUST, OPTIMISTS, BOSOM, HAND, SEAM. The last few topics are an erotic comical sequence with a woman.)
- ”Tobold (II)” (Note: About 20 pages in length. Includes "Essay on the Aristocracy".) (1920)
- ”The End of the World” (1917)
- ”I Have Nothing” (Note: On a countryside walk, a cheerful carefree pauper is approached by a sequence of silent domesticated animals including a calf, a dog, and a nanny goat. Part of the narration says: "He'd have liked to help [them] cross over from the narrow, poor animal realm into a freer, better existence. 'But I am nothing, can do nothing, and have, for heaven's sake, nothing [...].") (1917)
- ”The Aunt” (Note: The narrator walks to various landscapes, lodgings, and towns. The narrator compares himself to a robber and Rinaldini. A cousin inadvertently crosses paths with him, they chat, and then visit his aunt. The next morning, the aunt attempts to give him a new suit and the narrator makes a long Walserian speech to decline it.) (1918)
- ”The Old Fountain” (1919)
- ”The Dinner Party” (1919)
- ”The Last Prose Piece” (1919)

=== Berne (1921-1933) ===
- ”The Alphabet”
- ”Ladies' Shoes”
- ”Energetic”
- ”Robert the Rascal”
- ”Fridolin”
- ”Should Promises Be Broken?”
- ”The Elephant”
- ”The Sweetheart”
- ”The One of Fairy Tales”
- ”The Green Spider”
- ”She's such a nice woman ...”
- ”Goddess of Poetry ...”
- ”The Strange Girl”
- ”The Chinese Woman, the Chinaman”
- ”A Lump of Sugar”
- ”fe t'adore”
- ”Kurt”
- ”Horse and Bear”
- ”Sunday Walk (I)”
- ”Letter to Edith”
- ”Salon Episode”
- ”Birthday Prose Piece”
- ”An Immortal”
- ”There exist drunken geniuses ...”
- ”All those who like to laugh while crying...”
- ”A Flaubert Prose Piece”
- ”Minotaur”
- ”Masquerade”
- ”Sampler Plate”
- ”Prose Piece”
- ”Moonlight Story”
- ”Beneath a Linden”
- ”I Was Reading in the Forest”
- ”The Boy (II)”
- ”A Small Town”
- ”The Worn-out Man”
- ”Boat Trip”
- ”The Girl (II)”

== Speaking to the Rose (2005) ==
- "A Note on Van Gogh’s L'Arlesienne" (1912)
- "Brentano" (Note: German romantic poet Clemens Brentano) (1913)
- "Writing Geschwister Tanner" (1914)
- "The Back Alley" (Note: Original German title "Die Untere Gasse", meaning "The Lower Lane". Middleton notes that his re-titling is inaccurate, relates the terminology to city landscapes like Zurich, and speculates Walser's scene in this piece must be in Biel.) (1916)
- "The Story of the Prodigal Son" (1917)
- "The Cave Man" (Note: The narrator contemplates if there's any difference between cave-men and modern people.) (1918)
- "Dreaming" (1920)
- "Hercules" (1920)
- "Odysseus" (Note: In the words of Mark Harman, Walser transforms the ancient Greek mythical heroes into "parodic mundane life-stories" in which they do daily household Swiss-style chores.) (1920)
- "Theseus" (1920)
- "Olga’s Story" (Note: A woman narrates parts of her life, including a romance that ends up with the man leaving her for another woman, and the couple visits her which has a tormenting effect, yet the woman lives with them for a time) (1921)
- "Something about Goethe" (1921)
- "The Robber" (Note: Also see The Robber) (1921)
- "The One and Only" (Note: Seemingly describes a woman. The first lines are, "She to whom poems are addressed, who is significant, who writes no poems hut is a poem significant to a poet—I know her. If one is fresh with her, she shows only glorious astonishment. I have sung her, but not yet to my satisfaction.") (1924 composition, 1938 published)
- "Finally she condescended" (1924)
- "The Fairytale Town" (1925)
- "The Blind Man" (1925)
- "And now he was playing, alas, the piano" (1925)
- "An Essay on Lion Taming" (1925)
- "These little services" (Note: Narrates a vision of a countess who rides toward the narrator on a horse.) (1925)
- "Ramses II" (Note: In Mark Harman's analysis, the Pharoah is depicted as an addict of trashy novels and shares Walser's tendency to "antagonize educated people." The work also refers to Johann Künzle, an herbalist who had an influential work published in 1911) (1925)
- "Spanish Wine Hall" (1925)
- "It can so happen that" (Note: This piece refers to the Rif War in Morocco) (1926)
- "Brentano (III)" (Note: The "III" refers to this being Walser's third piece on the subject) (1926)
- "From the Life of a Writer" (1926)
- "Letter of a European" (Note: Among other things, this piece connects to Walser's anger at Thomas Mann having called Walser's 1925 book Die Rose childish) (1926)
- "O how in this not large" (Note: Discusses the social, historical, and architectural aspects of a lakeside palace or cloister.) (1926)
- "Apparently not a cloud was to be seen" (Note: Describes the natural scenery, birds, and social history of a region the narrator has visited. The story doesn't specify the exact place, because: "Where this country, or neck-of-the-woods, is, I’d therefore rather not tell, otherwise everything on two legs would travel and leap and rush and walk thither, disconcerting it with curiosity, which usually has nasty and noxious results.") (1926)
- "The White Lady" (Note: Discusses a figure that the narrator saw but doesn't want to talk about, an "apparition" of a woman, a male adversary of the narrator, and a walk that took 20 hours. The final line is that the woman "could be the soul of Europe, perhaps even the World Soul, motionless there, not willing to walk any more.") (1926)
- "The Red Thread" (Note: Seemingly a contemplation on desire, which the narrator calls a red thread running through history and compares to a woman on a horse. The piece discusses Paradise, freedom, and the development of civilizations. "It seems indisputable that the concept of conquest and the idea of freedom become almost indistinguishable [...].") (1926)
- "I would like to be standing" (1927) (Note: Year of composition is not known with certainy)
- "Loud expressions of opinion" (1927)
- "Letter to a Patient Lady" (1927)
- "The stage-space might have measured" (Note: The piece includes reference to a woman named Preziosa) (1927)
- "Looking out into the landscape" (1927)
- "It’s still not so long ago" (Note: The first lines are, "It’s still not so long ago that I had an urge sometimes to roar. A rage, directed mainly against myself, turned my inner life into a quivering phosphoric bog.") (1927)
- "Cabaret Scene" (Note: Middleton reports that he changed the format of the piece to a versified play script though the original format was prose, and labels the piece as a "dramolet or minidrama long before the "Hörspiel" or radio play was instituted.") (1927)
- "The idea was a delicate one" (Note: Includes allusion to Sage Graf von Gleichen) (1928)
- "Execution Story" (Note: A sketch of a critical tribunal calling for a writer's death over having written an unliked book, which the narrator says the author was seduced into writing by an "uncommonly nice woman, who now and then offered him a bonbon.") (1928)
- "To a Poet" (Note: May refer to Hugo von Hofmannsthal and/or Albert Steffen) (1928)
- "She addressed me in the formal style" (Note: Christopher Middleton categorizes this piece among microscript sketches where Walser retells stories, real or made-up, after gleaning ideas from the jackets of trashy novels (which Walser defended as part of literary tradition).) (1928)
- "Prose Piece" (Note: A nature piece. The first lines are, "Between snowflakes and leaves there are resemblances. At the sight of snow falling one thinks that one is seeing small flowers that are falling from the sky. Why is foliage dying in the autumn secretly golden, and why does one think of springtime flowers having tongues, to shape some kind of conversation?") (1927 or 1929)
- "My Endeavors" (1928)
- "I Was Reading Two Stories" (1930)
- "A Propos the Kissing of a Hand" (1930)
- "The Avenue" (Note: The narrator speaks of a beautiful avenue around a lake that he has found, and discusses a painter he observed who doesn't know about the avenue. The narrator is also distracted by thoughts of food.) (1931)
- "Heroic Landscape" (1931)
- "The Gifted Person" (Note: Middleton identifies the location as Bahnhofstrasse in Zurich, but Tom Whalen believes that was a mistake and points to Biel, explaining that both cities have a Bahnhofstrasse. The piece also refers to Potsdamer Platz in Berlin) (1932)
- "The Lake" (Note: Also see two other Walser pieces about lakes in "Greifen Lake" and "By the Lake", collected in A Schoolboy's Diary) (1932)
- ""Kennst Du sie?" (Note: I.e. "Do you know her?") (1930, poem. Presented in the Epilogue. I.e. "Do you know her?")

== Microscripts (2010) ==
- "Radio"
- "Swine"
- "Jaunts elegant in nature now lay in the past"
- "If I am properly informed as to her circumstances"
- "What a nice writer I ran into"
- "The Songstress"
- "The Demanding Fellow"
- "Somewhere and somewhen, in a region"
- "The Train Station" (Note: This piece is similar in perceptions and feelings to Walser's piece "Something About the Railway" collected in Berlin Stories)
- "Crisis" (Note: The piece begins by noting that the fact that children at play are merry puts the narrator in a "critical frame of mind", then explores a claim by a "Herr Zigerli" that there is a "crisis of cheerfulness" affecting society. He also sketches what appears to be a romantic affair with a woman.)
- "So here was a book again"
- "Is it perhaps my immaturity"
- "The Prodigal Son"
- "Usually I first put on a prose piece jacket" (Note: The narrator describes observing a joyful children's game of rolling beer-glass mats, which an extremely cheerful dog is accompanying. He then describes a majestically lonely woman who is at a window, gives a recollection of being paid in bread for work, and discusses the writing itself.)
- "My subject here is a victor"
- "A will to shake that refined individual" (Note: The opening line is, "A will to shake that refined individual, to rattle him about as if he were a scraggly tree bearing only isolated jittery leaves seems to be stirring within me.")
- "He numbered [...] among the good"
- "Journey to a Small Town" (Note: Includes the lines "For some time now I have intentionally [...] been neglecting so-called elegancy with regard to my manner of writing and thinking, so that it might, conserved, remain available for my use, since the finer things are particularly swift to wear out." The narrator also discusses castles and inquires anthropologically and comically about castle life. He also discusses a sturm und drang play he recently saw.)
- "The Marriage Proposal"
- "Autumn"
- "A Sort of Cleopatra"
- "On failing to prize the chance to spend time in a cosmopolitan city"
- "As I was instructed by a book"
- "Schnapps" (Note: The narrator seemingly discusses alcoholism and adds that "to get schnappsed" is a regional expression that means to receive a reprimand. Also see: Schnapps. The narration says that it contains words of warning, and among other things depicts a woman saying to a husband "cut out the boozing!")
- "New Year's Page"

== Berlin Stories (2012) ==
Pieces are translated by Susan Bernofsky except in three cases where otherwise noted.

=== The City Streets ===
- "Good Morning, Giantess!" (1907)
- "The Park"
- "Friedrichstrasse" (1907)
- "Market"
- "Aschinger" (Note: A short piece about a rapid service chain restaurant which was a new advent at a time when mass transit allowed an unprecedented number of people to arrive at and pass through areas of the city quickly. Berlin's first subway opened in 1902)
- "The Metropolitan Street"
- "Berlin W"
- "Tiergarten" (1911)
- "In the Electric Tram" (1908)
- "The Metropolitan Street"

=== The Theater ===
- "The Theater, a Dream"
- "A Person of Possessed of Curiosity"
- "On the Russian Ballet" (Note: Walser discusses the Petersburg Imperial Theatre ballerinas visiting Berlin at the time, including Anna Pavlova and the current Harlequin's Millions. Walser claims the audience has a sophisticated response unlike the behavior for an Ibsen play or Wagner opera.)
- "Portrait Sketch"
- "On Staging Lies"
- "Do You Know Meier?"
- "Four Amusements" (1907) (Note: The 4 amusements are: A) a description of an apparently fictional poet "Seltmann" observed in a coffee shop; B) disappointment about the actor Gertrud Eysoldt having announced that she's changing from theatre to business shopkeeping, and about another similarly "absconding" actor Friedrich Kayssler; C) an amusing policy change concerning uniforms at the Kammerspiele theater; D) Max Reinhardt's recent idea to use only blank white backdrops in his productions.)
- "Cowshed"
- "An Actor"

=== Berlin Life ===
- "Fabulous"
- "Mountain Halls" (Note: A description of a variety show venue on Unter den Linden. Max Brod said that this story was one of Franz Kafka's favorites, and that Kafka would laugh hysterically when reading it aloud.) (1908)
- "The Little Berliner" (Note: Translated by Harriett Watts.) (Note: In this short story, a 12-year old girl narrates her opinions, contemplations, and recent events in her family life.)
- "Flower Days" (Note: Translated by Christopher Middleton) (Note: About Cornflower Day, a holiday occasion when people wear blue. The blue cornflower is the national flower of Germany.)
- "Fire"
- "Something About the Railway"
- "What Became of Me"
- "Food for Thought"

=== Looking Back ===
- "Remembering the Tales of Hoffman"
- "The Tanners"
- "The Secretary" (Note: Walser served for several months as secretary for the Berlin Secession, a group of artists who left the official Association of Berlin Artists in 1892.)
- "Frau Bahni"
- "Full" (Note: Includes the ongoing comical battle between a Berlin Omnibus driver, which was horse-drawn at the time, and crowds trying to get on when it's supposedly full.) (1916)
- "Horse and Woman"
- "Frau Wilke"
- "Frau Scheer"
- "The Millionairess"
- "A Homecoming in the Snow"

== A Schoolboy's Diary (2013) ==
Some of these stories contain multiple sub-titled sections or sub-pieces. The count of pieces in the book is sometimes given as over 70.

- "Fritz Kocher's Essays" (1904)

Introduction
Man
Autumn
The Fire
Friendship
Poverty
School
Politeness
Nature
Open Topic From the Imagination
Careers
The Fatherland
My Mountain
Our City
Christmas
Instead of an Essay
The Fair
Music
The Essay
The Classroom

- "Greifen Lake" (Note: Greifensee (lake) in Switzerland) (1899)
- "Six Little Stories" (1901; 1914)

1. About a Poet
2. Lute
3. Piano
4., 5. (Untitled)
6. The Beautiful Place)

- "Letter from a Poet to a Gentleman" (1914)
- "The Poet" (1914)
- "The Mountain" (1914)
- "A Curious City" (Note: The first lines are, "Once there was a city. The people there were all puppets. [...] They not only said: Good morning, or: Good night, they meant it too, and with all their hearts.") (1905; 1914)
- "The Island" (Note: The first line is, "Two newlyweds from Berlin went on a trip.") (1914)
- "[Untitled, Crossed Out]" (thought to be 1910)
- "The Heathstone" (1914)
- "Two Little Things" (1914)
- "By the Lake" (1915)
- "The City" (1915)
- "Spring" (1915)
- "A Schoolboy's Diary" (Note: The narrator says that he is a secondary-school student and it is truly time to think about life more seriously, which he does by describing in detail various teachers, authority figures, and fellow students including Fritz Kocher.) (1908; 1914)
- "Hanswurst" (1914)
- "School Visit" (Note: The narrator warmly describes when a person visited a local school and was satisfied by everything he observed about the school, instruction, the teacher, and the children's behavior, somewhat like an inspector. At the end, the narrator reveals that he was the visitor.) (1921)
- "Hat-Chitti" (Note: Explained in the story as "furious anger over a hat", a mean-spirited children's "game" or harassment ritual. Susan Bernofsky explains in her Walser biography that "chitti" is equivalent to "shit fit" in English.) (1915)
- "The Rowboat" (Note: The first line is, "I think I have already described this scene but I want to write it again.") (1914)
- "Ascent by Night" (Note: The narrator travels to a remote home in the mountains at night by train and then by foot. When he finally reaches the house, and the door is opened, and he is recognized with a lantern light in his face, he notes the details with an apparent sublime feeling.) (1914)
- "Adventure on a Train" (1914)
- "Apollo and Diana" (Note: In the story a woman "prudishly" removes a photo of Lucas Cranach the Elder's painting of the same name from Walser's lodging) (1914)
- "A Story" (Note: The story describes ups and downs in a romantic relationship. The two people end up married. The pieces resembles several other short works by Walser that are noted as re-creations or parodies of pulp novels.) (1921)
- "The New Novel" (Note: The narrator describes the feelings of being repeatedly asked by people about how his new novel is coming along, including a publisher who says, "I would ask you to put off visiting my office until you are in a position to lay your new and good novel on my desk.") (1918)
- "The Letter" (Note: The narrator portrays a letter that is an absurdly critical message from a woman rejecting a man's attempted courtship.) (1918)
- "The Italian Novella" (1917)
- "Caseman and Houseman" (Note: The narrator says that a publisher told a writer one day that he go on a trip to Japan:"Pack your suitcase immediately, or your briefcase, or your cosmetics case for all I care, and without deliberating for a long time beforehand set out for Japan. Got it?" In real life, publisher Bruno Cassirer had sent Karl Walser on a trip to Japan to help him forget a recent grievous experience. In the story, "Houseman" appears to represent Robert Walser, and "Caseman" Karl.) (1917)
- "The Idol" (1914)
- "The Cover" (Note: The story involves a novel manuscript labored over by a writer who is affected when someone remarks that "for the time being" the only thing they can praise is the book's cover.) (1920)
- "The Great Talent" (Note: The "great talent" is described in the story as a "total do-nothing" who has difficulty dealing with his would-be benefactors.) (1918)
- "The Wicked Woman" (1917)
- "A Son and His Mother" (1917)
- "Student and Teacher" (1917)
- "A Model Student" (Note: The student in the title is described as "frightfully respectable" and useless at games and jokes, and who is ambitious without being impressive or interesting.) (1925)
- "The Tale of the Four Happy Fellows" (1925, Unpublished)
- "Summer in the Country" (Note: Based on a vacation trip to the Baltic coast, Rügen island, and Ribnitz in 1911. Switzerland is land-locked and this is a rare ocean description by Walser. The short piece describes the relaxation, laziness, meals, perceptions, natural landscape, brown-sailed boats, and lack of light pollution, on a vacation.)(1914)
- "Swift and Sluggish" (1917)
- "From My Youth" (1919)
- "All Right Then" (Note: Includes the lines, "Hey, writer! Jesus! What's wrong with you? Are you insane? What's wrong with me? Nothing at all, nothing at all. Please! And I am not in the least insane. I beg a thousand pardons but may I dare maintain that I am completely fine. I am totally normal and reliable in every respect.") (1917)
- "Reading" (and "The Woman Who Read Gottfried Keller") (1917)
- "A Devil of a Story" (1916)
- "The Soldier" (1914)
- "Something About Soldiers" (1915)
- "In the Military" (1915)
- "The German Language" (Note: The narrator appears to indirectly use the German language as a stand-in for indirect commentary for Germany's fate and world-standing after World War I.) (1919)
- "Morning and Night" (1920)
- "Flowers" (1920)
- "The Little Tree" (1925)
- "The Last Prose Piece" (1919)
- "Hans" (1920)

== Looking at Pictures (2015) ==
Pieces are translated by Susan Bernofsky except in cases where otherwise noted.

- "A Painter" (Note: A 20-30 page long story in which the narrator claims to have found a painter's notebook, which he presents to the reader. The notebook discusses a relationship with another character, The Countess, and various thoughts about art.)
- "Apollo and Diana (Note: Re: Lucas Cranach the Elder - Apollo and Diana (1530). In the story, a woman has repeatedly "prudishly" removed a photo of the painting from Walser's lodging) (1914)
- "The Van Gogh Picture" (Note: Discusses Van Gogh's L'Arlesienne (1888))
- "A Note on Van Gogh's L'Arlesienne" (Note: A second piece about L'Arlésienne (1888). Stephen Hough has said about this Walser prose piece, "[Walser] explores the unspoken emotions in that woman's face, the suffering, the stoicism, and then the quiet dignity." The narrator gives detailed deductive extrapolations about the life of the woman in the painting.)
- "Portrait of a Lady" (Note: Translated by Lydia Davis) (Note: Discusses Karl Walser's painting Portrait of a Lady (1902) which depicts a woman reading a book.)
- "The Dream (I)" (Note: Describes Karl Walser's The Dream (1903) as if it was a dream that the narrator experienced, without explicit reference to the painting.)
- "Watercolors" (Note: Walser notes that "the watercolorist is perhaps a feuilletonist in the field of painting.")
- "Hodler's Beech Forest" (Note: Discusses Ferdinand Hodler's painting The Beech Forest (1885).)
- "An exhibition of Belgian Art" (Note: The narrator makes a number of digressions with almost no relevance to the Belgian art exhibition, including a Bernese art exhibition, Goethe, the history of the Swiss confederacy, people's hats in a cafe, and general artistic trends. The final line is, "Everything I have neglected to say can be given voice by others.")
- "The Brueghel Picture" (Note: Discusses Brueghel the Younger's copy of Brueghel the Elder's The Parable of the Blind.)
- "Catastrophe" (Note: The book does not indicate or present any specific painting, but Michael Miller at Book Forum notes in his review: "probably about Albert Bierstadt's The Burning Ship, circa 1871. [Walser] the writes as if he has boarded the sinking ship himself. There, he finds two lovers who, in Walser's increasingly unhinged fantasia, acquire an ornate back story." See the painting here.)
- "Saul and David (II)" (Note: Discusses Rembrandt's painting Saul and David (ca. 1653).)
- "Diaz's Forest" (Note: Discusses Narcisse Virgilio Diaz's painting The Forest Clearing (1875). The prose piece and artwork was re-published as free open access at The Guardian.)
- "The Artist"
- "Olympia" (Note: Re: Édouard Manet's 1863 painting Olympia. The narrator has a conversation with a woman in the painting.)
- "Come here, beloved new fresh beautiful tale of a painter" (Note: From a microscript composed in 1924, and not published in Walser's lifetime, hence being titled after the first line. The piece describes two women, the wife of a painter ("Zahler") and the Lady of the Manor, showing each other their knickers, which results in the Lady of the Manor getting her portrait painted by the husband.)
- "Scene from the Life of the Painter Karl Stauffer-Bern" (Note: Re: the painter Karl Stauffer-Bern, who had an affair that led to his imprisonment and suicide, plus the suicide of the woman he had the affair with, Lydia Welti, which all occurred when Walser was a child. The book reprints Stauffer-Bern's portrait of Lydia Welti.)
- "Among other things he painted Madame his Mama" (Note: From a microscript. The piece alludes to an artist who had a life of "grievousness obtained, one might say, in the district of commerce ministers' wives" among other details. The narrator says at one point, "Thank God no one will suspect whom we're talking about.") (1925)
- "Aubrey Beardsley" (Note: The book re-prints an 1892 self-portrait by Aubrey Beardsley. The narrator muses on Beardsley himself, extrapolates about his personality from his art, and also says: "Today he seems to have been somewhat forgotten. Well, then these lines will recall him. It is pleasant to talk about someone who does not form the conversation of the day." The prose piece and self-portrait are re-published as free open access at The Guardian) (1926)
- "A Tiny Little Bit of Watteau" (Note: Re: Jean-Antoine Watteau's painting The Italian Comedians. Written in the form of a stage play in which the characters give monologs about themselves. The script names the central figure "The Indifferent Man", and the man extending his arm gives a monolog including the lines: "[...] perhaps only I myself find [my feelings] comprehensible. I can stick out my arm, and then it lives as if mum--a mummer--in the immobility of its extension, and my moonlight face displays a rollicking gauntness [...].")
- "Watteau" (Note: Discusses Antoine Watteau himself and his painting The Dance (1716))
- "A Picture by Jean-Honoré Fragonard" (Note: Re: Fragonard - The Happy Accidents of the Swing (1767))
- "The Kiss (III)" (Note: Re: Jean-Honore Fragonard's painting - The Stolen Kiss (1787). The prose piece and artwork were re-published for free open access at The Nation.)
- "A Discussion of a Picture" (Note: The prose piece and the book don't specify the painting, but the narrator says about the work: it dates from the 1870's, "from the age of the Brothers Goncourt, from the heyday of Emile Zola", it might remind a person of Flaubert's character Madame Arnoux from Sentimental Education, the woman is sitting at a table near a mirror, and the wallpaper is pale green.)} (1926)
- "Thoughts on Cezanne" (Note: Discusses Cezanne's works and artistic persona in general and his painting Madame Cezanne (ca. 1888), with commentary on his images of fruits, wines, etc. The narrator states, "One might keep an eye on the peculiarity that he looked upon his wife as if she were a fruit on the tablecloth. For him the outlines, the contours of his wife were exactly the same simple but also complicated ones as he'll have seen around flowers, glasses, dishes, knives, forks, tablecloths, fruits, and coffeepots and cups. A pat of butter was for him just as significant as a delicate pleat corrugating his wife's dress. I recognize that my wording here is inadequate [...]." The book presents an image of Cezanne's 1888 portrait of his wife.) (1929)

== Girlfriends, Ghosts, and Other Stories (2016) ==
- "A Morning" (Note: In Benjamin Woodard's summary, "[it] recounts the tedium and minutiae of office work, speaks to [Walser's] love of nature, toys with the confines of a traditional job, describes a harried worker as 'Totally Be-Mondayed' and his environment "a life among desks." Characters battle over an opened window, a woman outside sings, and [...] Mother Nature [outside] makes the morning hours drag for the men stuck indoors.")
- "She Writes" (Note: A seemingly angry letter written by a woman who worked as nude model for a painter and is demanding payment, among other discussions. The piece begins, "Hey, old monster. Tell me, where the hell are you? [...] You seem to be hiding, pretending not to be at home.")
- "An ABC in Pictures by Max Liebermann" (Note: Discusses an illustrated book of the alphabet by artist Max Liebermann) (1909)
- "Sketch (I)" (Note: Seemingly a parody of romance novel.)
- "Poetry (I)"
- "The Forest"
- "Lunch Break" (Note: The full text has been posted online by The New York Review.) (1914)
- "The Kitten (I)"
- "A Little Ramble"
- "The Hand Harp" (Note: A short discussion of the music and particular instrument played by "farmhands or lads" often in front of the houses "where their young maidens dwell.")
- "The Goddess" (Note: The narrator describes a goddess who descends onto the road on a cloud that resembles a swan. All the nearby people see her. The cloud departs and the sight vanishes, and people go into cafes to tell of the event.)
- "The Look"
- "The Morning"
- "Autumn Afternoon"
- "The Man"
- "The Grave of the Mother"
- "Remember This" (Note: Seemingly a poetic reminiscence of the sublime. It includes advice about, "If indifference and unkindness take hold of your being, stir your memory and [...]". The full text has been posted online by The New York Review. (1914))
- "On the Terrace" (Note: Woodard writes that this piece "vividly describes a rain shower’s effect on a lake")
- "The Little Sheep"
- "Spring" (Note: The narrator observes a bird "trying to practice its singing, endeavoring to loosen its throat")
- "A Little Expedition"
- "Ash, Needle, Pencil, and Match" (Note: The narrator writes short essays that "bring to light a variety of curiosities" on the 4 seemingly uninteresting items in the title. He notes at the beginning, about these items: "it's possible to say something meaningful [...] only by deeper penetration." The full text has been posted online by The New York Review.)
- "The Young Traveling Salesman" (Note: The narrator recalls a pulp magazine story he read as a boy.)
- "Toothache"
- "The Nimble and the Lazy"
- "No One" (Note: A fairy tale)
- "The Murderess" (Note: The narrator is informed that a random passerby previously killed her husband, and notes her appearance is like "any upright, honest, diligent woman.")
- "Lake Piece"
- "Schwendimann" (Note: A man named Schwendimann restlessly visits various locations including a pawnship, butcher, courthouse, poorhouse, and firehouse, etc, but dully finds at each place his own indecisiveness and lack of purpose. He eventually finds peace at the "house that everyone finds in the end", which has a skeleton at the door.)
- "The Forsaken One"
- "Dear Little Swallow" (Note: The narrator writes a letter to the bird. The first lines are, "I saw you early today from the window and now I'm writing to you, which perhaps is pointless, since it's unlikely the letter will reach you, and in any case you're unacquainted with reading. Also you're not in the address book, but surely you live enchantingly in your hidden nest where you sleep and dream. Apropos: You always find enough food, don't you?")
- "The Children’s Game" (Note: Seemingly a commentary on World War I, in which children play a game of pointless cyclical domination.) (1919)
- "The Philosopher"
- "Page from a Diary (I)"
- "Tram Ride"
- "The Kitten (II)"
- "Latest News" (1921)
- "News Number Two" (1921)
- "News Three" (Note: The narrator discusses various audience members ("some of whom had over-imbibed") and performers who he observed at a burlesque theater. The narrator then changes subjects to details he perceived on a recent trip to Thun, Wichtrach, the Bernese Oberland, Heimberg, and to the small island house where Kleist once lived.) (1921)
- "Fourth News" (Note: The narrator discusses several random details, then focuses on the subject of a "NEWSPAPER." He describes comically extreme indecisiveness about the issue of picking up and reading a nearby newspaper, or not.) (1921)
- "Congratulations on the Twenty-Fifth Anniversary of the Journal Die Schweiz"
- "How Are You?" (Note: A discussion of the title expression, which begins "Isn't it quite irrelevant how we answer such a question?" The narrator also says, "To confess with a quip on your lips that you've gone to the dogs doesn't cause any harm." He observes that expressing discontent attests to discomfort.)
- "Afternoon Tea"
- "The Girls" (1924)
- "Overcoats"
- "Shadow"
- "The Lover and the Unknown Girl"
- "The Tip" (Note: The first lines are, "What did I do recently? Am I still worthy of writing a prose piece? Will anyone ever again consider me a poet? I doubt it, because I accepted a tip. Do authors accept delivery fees? Let me explain.")
- "The Keller Novella" (Note: The narrator discusses Gottfried Keller's A Village Romeo and Juliet.)
- "Walser on Walser" (Note: According to Simon Wortham, "the writer addresses himself but then views the results as if contemplating a letter that is addressed to him. Such letters may be sent (as presumably they often were), he concludes, by concerned parties worrying over his literary future.")
- "Sacher-Masoch" (Note: About Leopold von Sacher-Masoch)
- "Shop Windows (I)"
- "Gretchen"
- "Porcelain" (Note: A short drama script. The characters and venue are specified as porcelein figurines in a display window of a trinket shop.)
- "Ludwig" (Note: Marked as "A Review" in the first line. The narrator comments on the characters Ludwig, "Mr. Batschano", and an "Edith." In the final lines of the piece, the narrator seemingly quotes a line from the reviewed book, but then says: "That's not in the book; it's penned by me. What a curious source I'm drawing from here.") (1925)
- "It’s All Right, Miss" (Note: In this short piece, the narrator hears a man say the title phrase to a woman who had a "mishap" in a restaurant. The narrator muses on how the words are polite but discourteous, and how the man failed to give any real assistance.)
- "Essay on Bismarck"
- "Anecdote"
- "The Nobel Prize" (Note: The narrator tells of being fooled by a false notice in the newspaper about the winner of the Nobel Prize. The narrator uses placeholder or allegorical names and says that "Hopeful" (who he also calls "High-hope") did not win the prize, instead "Persistence" did. The narration includes the lines, "Yesterday I was like a snapped-off plant, while today I'm a sturdy tree. What illusions can do to us! Brain power, you're weird!" A full text is posted online by Suhrkamp Verlag.) (1926)
- "The Carousel"
- "'Underappreciated Poets Among Us?'—Answer to a Survey" (Note: According to Simon Wortham, the piece "reflects ironically on the supposedly luxurious, gentlemanly life of the struggling writer and the fashionable benefits assumed to accompany cultish underappreciation.")
- "Discussion" (Note: Among other things, the narration touches on Marcel Proust, Romain Rolland, the "Augsburger Abendblatter," Heinrich Heine, someone's unfunny essay on the subject of "divine Italian laughter", the Fuggerhäuser in Augsburg, the Berlin Secession, Walther Rathenau's high opinion of Hermann Hesse's Peter Camenzind (1904), Tolstoy's supposedly anecdotal early attack on Shakespeare, a hurdy-gurdy player, a comedian, Haydn's The Seasons, and says he has read Anatole France.)
- "Girlfriends"
- "The Young Woman in the Country House"
- "The Bob" (Note: About the bob haircut. Benjamin Woodard writes that this piece and "The Girls" are "perhaps unintentional slips into sexism and degradation masked as good humor. The inclusion of these works may temper the attraction of Walser to some.")
- "The Red Leather Pouch" (Note: A spy story) (1927)
- "Detective Novel" (1927)
- "Poet Story" (Note: The narration includes, "I'm not mocking the poet who each evening, to put it bluntly, ate cheese, and at midday, if you like, ingested soup, and led a solid life. Derision, in this instance, is the farthest thing from my mind.")
- "The Belletristic Book"
- "Garden Arbor Essay" (Note: The narrator says he alludes to novels published in the early editions of The Garden Arbor, and writes, "Do I adore The Garden Arbor? Yes, I believe I do." The magazine was the first successful mass-circulation German newspaper and a forerunner of modern magazines.)
- "Ghosts" (1928–1929)
- "Female Portrait"
- "A Man of the World"
- "Something About Writing"
- "Tolstoy and Hutten" (Note: The narrator explains that a Tolstoy character reminds him of Ulrich von Hutten and Ufenau.)
- "The Woman Novelist"
- "The Equestrienne" (Note: The narrator describes images from a woman's normal life before becoming a horse-rider, then transitions from her spiritual desires to the poetic symbiosis he sees between the horse and the rider.)
- "She Bettered Herself"
- "A Woman’s Book" (Note: The narrator says he is unable to absorb Balzac's Peau de chagrin in German translation, then muses on various other impressions of storytelling, tropes, and a specific unnamed book. He observes that, "Famous authors can have a sobering effect, whereas a total unknown can invigorate us.") (1931)
- "The Coffeehouse" (Note: A description of sensory impressions and musings about a coffee shop, including patrons and their psychology, hat styles, servers, sounds, idleness, and the supposed balance of economic class in the coffeeshop. The narrator notes: "From time to time, the gérant, or manager, dropped in, as if it were becoming to quickly and nonchalantly examine the day's business." A full text version is posted online by NYRB.) (1931)
- "Literary Switzerland" (Note: A sociological historical fiction sketch. The first line is, "Once the Romans roamed through Switzerland disseminating culture. There might already have been settlements of significance that preceded them." The narrator briefly discusses figures (Jean-Jacques Rousseau, Gottfried Keller, Meyer, Gotthelf) and societal changes in literary history.)
- "Embonpoint"
- "The Bourgeois"
- "The Pipsqueak" (Note: The narrator says that the person referred to by the title has supposedly written "close to a hundred short novels, which, no matter how harshly you criticize them from a literary standpoint, forced their way into the public.")
- "Portrait of a Lady"
- "The Precious One" (Note: Describes a person "trying his best to believe himself happy." The narrator says the person will be so carefully handled in the piece that "the likeness I'm attempting resembles a breeze or fragrance." The person's childhood has idyllic surroundings, but "even as a child a special quality veiled him." The final line is, "He was gripped by an illness he could not resist, and leaving memories behind, let it lead him away.") (1932–1933)
- "Something About Eating" (Note: The year of this work, 1932-1933, was around the time that Walser was transferred against his will to a different sanatorium and abandoned writing. Among other comments, the narrator says that "Every sensible person sincerely praises a bowl of soup" and "Meals are eaten either at home or in a restaurant, bringing differences to light that aren't necessarily significant.") (1932–1933)
- "Mother Nature" (Note: The narrator discusses volcanos, earthquakes, floods, hurricanes, and also "an iceberg, which the captain has the task of carefully evading," etc. The opening line is, "Nature isn't always good; no, often she's enraged, and each time there are valid scientific reasons for this.") (1933)

== Little Snow Landscape ==
- "To My Home" (1905)
- "Two Little Fairy Tales"
- "Lenz’s Soldiers"
- "The Writer (I)"
- "Wenzel"
- "Farewell" (Note: Narrated by a fictionalized Abdul Hamid II, Turkey’s last sultan. Hamid was dethroned in 1909, the year the story was published in Neue Rundschau.) (1909)
- "Illusion"
- "Büchner’s Flight"
- "Cinema"
- "Birch-Pfeiffer"
- "Lenz"
- "The Hermitage"
- "Dream Vision"
- "The Dressmaker" (Note: In Brian Dillon's words, "a young woman goes to bed terrified in her sad, cavernous apartment. Sure enough, Death slides under the blankets with her, and by morning [...]: 'She lay there dead in her bed.'")
- "The Landscape (I)"
- "Walking"
- "The Shepherd"
- "The Invitation" (1914)
- "Sunday Morning"
- "The Moon"
- "Stroll (I)"
- "Little Snow Landscape"
- "Summer Night"
- "Christmas"
- "Hölderlin"
- "Würzburg"
- "The Worker"
- "Chamber Piece"
- "The Coward"
- "The Sausage"
- "Lamp, Paper, and Gloves"
- "Berta"
- "Louise"
- "Rain" (1918)
- "Pencil Note"
- "Letter from Biel"
- "The First Poem"
- "The Comrade"
- "The Proletarian"
- "The Aviator"
- "Munich"
- "Jean"
- "The Two Writers"
- "Mutterseelenallein"
- "Don Juan’s Letter"
- "Three Stories, Told Based on Book Covers"
- "The Beauty and the Faithful One"
- "The Angel"
- "Children and Small Houses"
- "Geneva"
- "The Yardstick"
- "Four Characters"
- "Notebook Extract"
- "The Young Servant"
- "A Lackey"
- "A Sort of Narrative"
- "Fairy Tale (II)"
- "Book Review" (1928)
- "Vacation (I)"
- "Fragment"
- "Walk in the Park"
- "Recently I Read . . ."
- "The Four Seasons"
- "Stroll (II)"
- "The Castle"
- "Hats"
- "Sunday Outing"
- "The Canal"
- "Childhood" (1933)

== Footnotes ==
Translators
