= Looking at Pictures =

2015 Short story collection by Robert Walser

- Author: Robert Walser
- Translator: Susan Bernofsky; Lydia Davis; Christopher Middleton
- Language: English
- Publisher: New Directions Publishing and Christine Burgin
- Publication date: 2015
- Publication place: United States
- Media type: Print
- Pages: 144

Looking at Pictures is a 2015 English-language collection of 25 prose pieces and feuilletons by the Swiss author Robert Walser, focused entirely on Walser's observations about paintings and artists. The writings date from the years 1902 to 1930 and are translated by Susan Bernofsky, Lydia Davis, and Christopher Middleton. The book includes a color image reproduction of each artwork discussed, which is presented alongside the writing.

== Background ==
Walser often spent time observing and ruminating on the visual arts while also publishing his written work in various newspapers and journals. His brother Karl Walser, with whom he lived for several years in Berlin, was an accomplished painter and stage set designer who gave Walser access to artistic social circles.

Most of the included pieces were published individually in Walser's lifetime with no intention of publishing them together.

== Style and themes ==
The pieces have been described as vignette-like, different from each other in style and temperament, and more about people than paintings. Some of the writings meticulously describe the painting in the title while others are meditations that barely touch on the artwork that is supposedly the subject.

In the words of Susan Bernofsky, Walser's "narrator often zeroes in on elements of a picture that would not ordinarily be the focus of a gaze of either a connoisseur or critic." In some cases, Walser makes a mockery of art appreciation and his role as critic, can't imagine a way to examine a piece until he imagines that the depicted scene comes alive, or digresses (seemingly ironically) on various names and topics without discussing what was named in the title. In Bernofsky's analysis, the prose pieces imply "that the value of art might lie in its ability to inspire viewers to rare and beautiful thoughts of their own."

Sam Korman at Flash Art wrote that Robert Walser’s prose is "attentive to surfaces in a way that is both dedicated and momentary. He misdirects, diverges and floats around the exterior of things to reveal the many beautiful and inscrutable points of connection." Michael Miller at Book Forum noted that the artworks "set the author's imagination in motion, inspiring him to concoct elaborate dramas that extend far beyond the confines of the scenes portrayed. The paintings he writes about all tend to spill outside of their boundaries."

Elisa Wouk Almino at Hyperallergic wrote that the essays are not traditional art criticism and resemble daily observations or journal entries. "The meandering manner with which Walser moves through artworks is like the aimless promenade he takes around town in his [stories about walks], stopping when a sight delights or intrigues him. He moves through details with a sense of discovery, mesmerized by the tablecloth in a Cézanne painting that 'is virtually smiling, beaming.'"

Tess Edmonson at C Magazine wrote that the texts, 100 years after their composition, are playful and very different from "contemporary art publishing’s thinkpiece economy." Edmonson also discusses diegetic breaks in the writings. For example, Walser imagines in "Diaz's Forest" that a woman tells her child, "I swear to you," she tell it, "as truthfully as I am standing here with you in this forest painted by Diaz, you must earn your livelihood with bitter toil so that you will not go to ruin inwardly." Also, the painting’s leaves "murmur" about "[what] has been written in this brief essay."

Dominic Jaeckle at 3AM Magazine categorized several kinds of writing in the collection: allegorical fiction, critical circumnavigation of unique artworks or inaccessible genius, oblique reviews presented in a highly personal and obfuscated vernacular, and blueprints for the quiet pleasures of criticism as a form of detective work.

=== Format ===
Most of the pieces are in Walser's common style of the feuilleton, in other words free-ranging essays that mix fictional short story or historical fiction with personal essay-like musings, or "chatty musings" in the words of one reviewer. Walser himself writes that one of the pieces is a "tiny, infinitesimally small little essaylet." (See main article on Walser's format and genre.)

== Reception ==
Will Stone in a review at the Times Literary Supplement called the writings extraordinary and wrote that the texts "fizz with mischievousness, panache, feverish energy, and archaic eloquence." Stone described Walser's visual eye "insightful, capricious and daring, wayward and unpredictable, at times endearingly comical." He observed that the "chatty musings" often end in "a bitter climax or sagacious denouement." He noted that the point of the writings is "less art criticism than an opportunity for Walser to unleash his unique imagination via the feeling or memory triggered by [the artworks]."

Dayton Hare at Michigan Daily wrote in a review, "Walser is alternatively witty and touching, offering both humorous observations about humankind and serious proposals about art. [...] One of his most striking characteristics is his ability to deftly blend the solemn exposition of ideas with gentle mockery. [...] It can be sardonic and funny, or it can be profound and insightful, or it can be all at the same time." Hare advised that the book can serve as light reading or not, depending on the reader.

Michael Miller at Book Forum wrote in a review that Walser's "eccentric enthusiasm provides a sense of cohesion and holds the reader's attention, even as [his] narratives grow [...] erratic. This [...] is why he can slip from irrational exuberance to depressive defeat, and remarkably [slip between styles], without apology, explanation, or even transition."

Michael Hofman at New York Review of Books wrote in a review that the "adorable bookling" is ideal to "slip into the pocket and take out to read in the elevator", and he urged "anyone with any tenderness in their soul" to buy one or two copies. Publishers Weekly wrote that the "slim volume" is an "illuminating collection." The reviewer said that "the assemblage and variety of writings serves as an artistic manifesto for one of the 20th century's most important writers and contributes to the recently revived interest in Walser's work." Musician Stephen Hough called the book wonderful. Kirkus Reviews called the essays "allusive and elusive."

Meeka Walsh at Border Crossing Magazine wrote that the writings show "sensual transport and miraculous engagement" with the art and "[do] very much with little." Walsh expressed surprise that Rilke and Walser never met or associated, as their literary careers happened at the same time. She gives examples of similar writing and sentiments between them about nature observations, color, and close sensory experience of art.

Barry Schwabsky at Hyperallergic wrote that works are marvelous, inimitable, charming, and break the rules of writing about painting: "Rule one: If the painting is not an illustration of an existing story, [...] resist inventing a story [that] the painting could have [...] illustrated. [...] Rule two: Don’t use the painting as an excuse to free-associate." Schwabsky called Walser one of the great literary free-associators, but expressed frustration that the pieces often didn't have enlightening explanations of how the artworks achieved the effects they did. Elisa Awouk Almino, also at Hyperallergic, wrote that the essays are not especially useful in grounding art in history, but stated "we don’t need to look to him for the findable facts" and quoted one of Walser's sentences from the book, "Everything I have neglected to say can be given voice to by others." Almino also stated, "beneath each of the essays in Looking at Pictures is a longing to express the feeling that drives art: the very joys and reasons for living."

Paul Maziar at ArtCritical wrote that Walser writes about art with "a distinctive rigor of discernment and impassioned description, [instead] of frigid academicism or conventions [...] to meet expectations." Maziar added that "we don’t come to this kind of book for news or intellectual rightness, much less the truth." He compared Walser's and Giorgio Vasari's writings about artists, as their "characterizations of people and the art of the past show a depth of feeling and a surprising poetic consciousness. Maziar particularly praised the humorous essay on Brueghel the Younger's copy of The Parable of the Blind (1616), saying "Walser’s turn of phrase, his oblique point of view and illogical descriptive methodology relative to the painting’s subject, make seeing it now a different experience."

== Pieces included ==
Pieces are translated by Susan Bernofsky except in cases where otherwise noted. Titles with non-conventional capitalization, i.e. lowercase keywords, refer to pieces that Walser never titled or published in his lifetime.

- "A Painter" (Note: A 20-30 page long story in which the narrator claims to have found a painter's notebook, which he presents to the reader. The notebook discusses a relationship with another character, The Countess, and various thoughts about art.)
- "Apollo and Diana (Note: Lucas Cranach - Apollo and Diana (1530) In the story, a woman has repeatedly "prudishly" removed a photo of Lucas Cranach the Elder's 1530 painting from Walser's lodging) (1914)
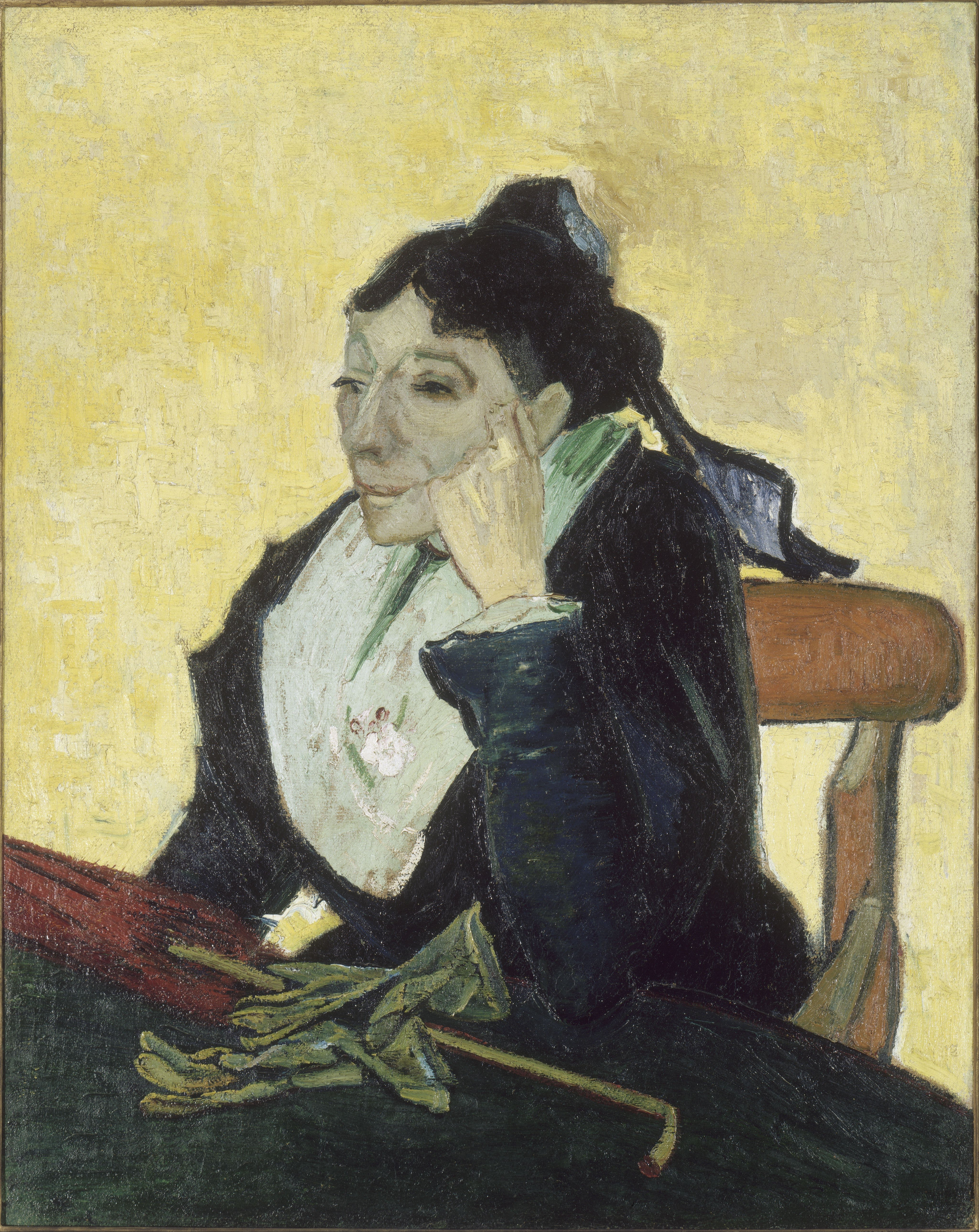
- "The Van Gogh Picture" (Note: Van Gogh - The Arlesienne Discusses Van Gogh's L'Arlesienne (1888))
- "A Note on Van Gogh's L'Arlesienne" (Note: Translated by Christopher Middleton) (Note: A second piece about L'Arlésienne (1888). Stephen Hough has said about this Walser prose piece, "[Walser] explores the unspoken emotions in that woman's face, the suffering, the stoicism, and then the quiet dignity." The narrator gives detailed deductive extrapolations about the life of the woman in the painting.)
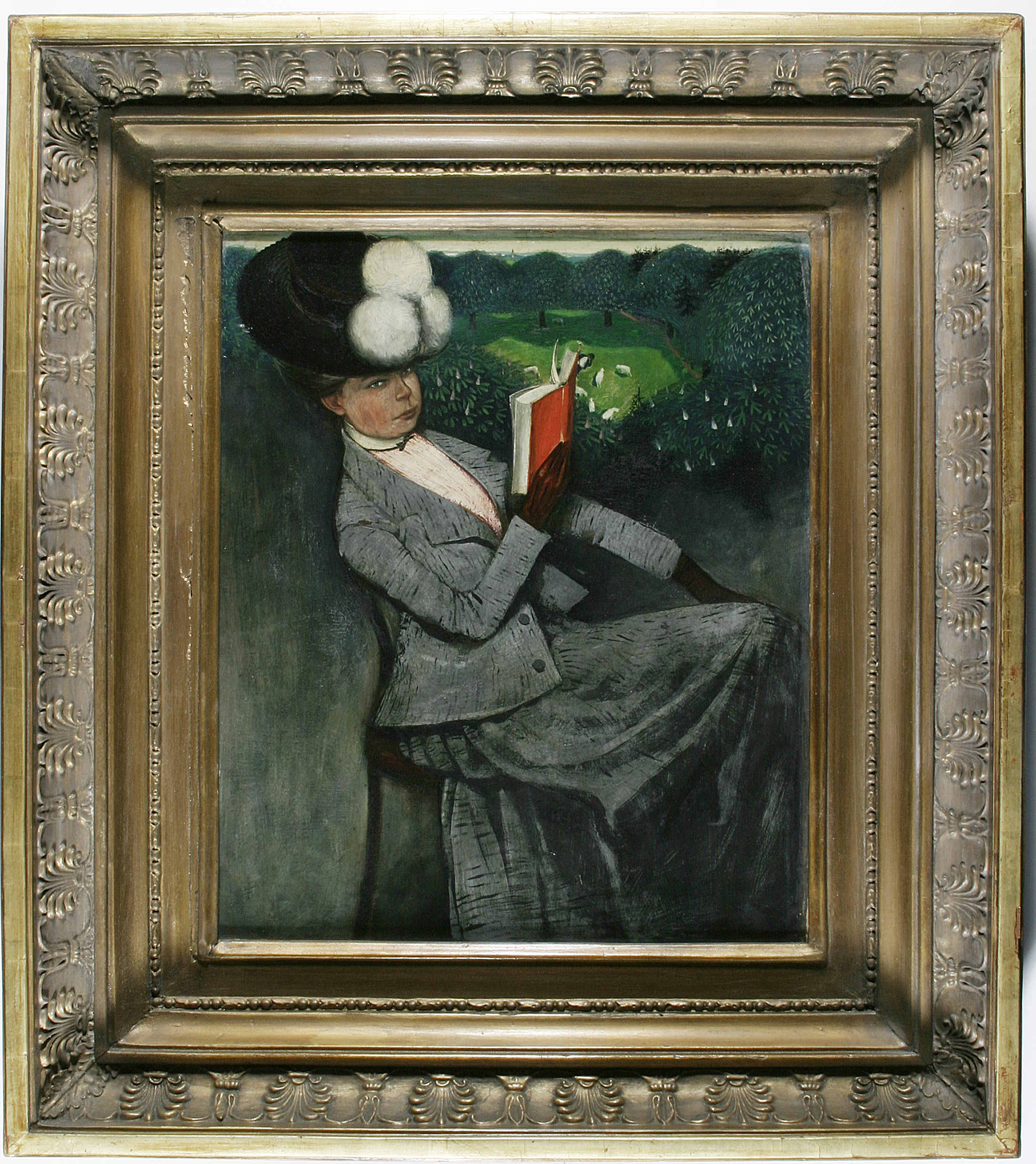
- "Portrait of a Lady" (Note: Translated by Lydia Davis) (Note: Discusses Karl Walser's painting Portrait of a Lady (1902) which depicts a woman reading a book. Karl Walser - Portrait of a Lady)
- "The Dream (I)" (Note: Describes Karl Walser's The Dream (1903) as if it was a dream that the narrator experienced, without explicit reference to the painting.)
- "Watercolors" (Note: Walser notes that "the watercolorist is perhaps a feuilletonist in the field of painting.")
- "Hodler's Beech Forest" (Note: Hodler - The Beech Forest Discusses Ferdinand Hodler's painting The Beech Forest (1885).)
- "An Exhibition of Belgian Art" (Note: The narrator makes a number of digressions with almost no relevance to the Belgian art exhibition, including a Bernese art exhibition, Goethe, the history of the Swiss confederacy, people's hats in a cafe, and general artistic trends. The final line is, "Everything I have neglected to say can be given voice by others.")
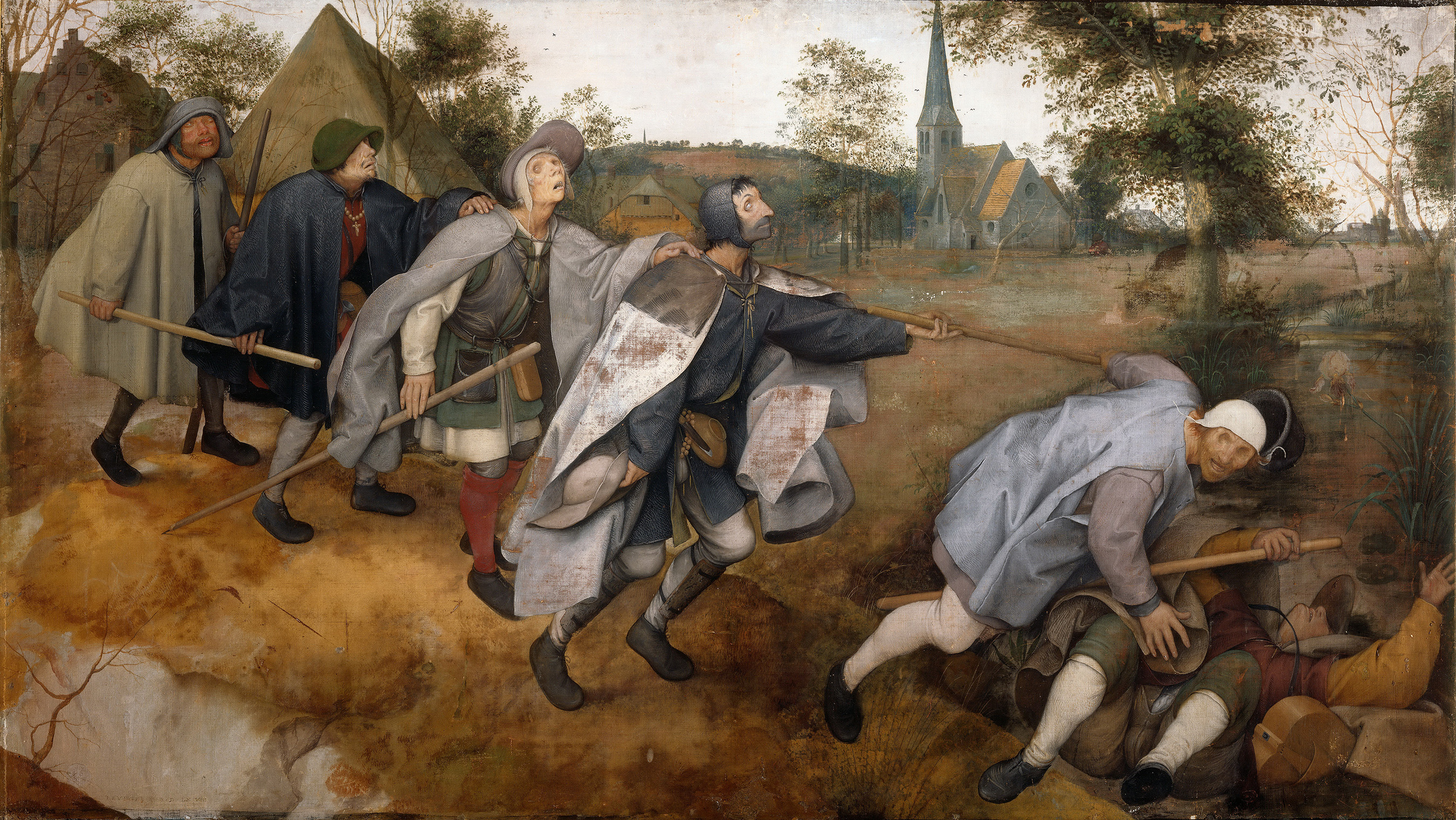
- "The Brueghel Picture" (Note: Discusses Brueghel the Younger's copy of Brueghel the Elder's The Parable of the Blind Brueghel - The Parable of the Blind.)
- "Catastrophe" (Note: The book does not indicate or present any specific painting, but Michael Miller at Book Forum notes in his review: "probably about Albert Bierstadt's The Burning Ship, circa 1871. [Walser] the writes as if he has boarded the sinking ship himself. There, he finds two lovers who, in Walser's increasingly unhinged fantasia, acquire an ornate back story.")
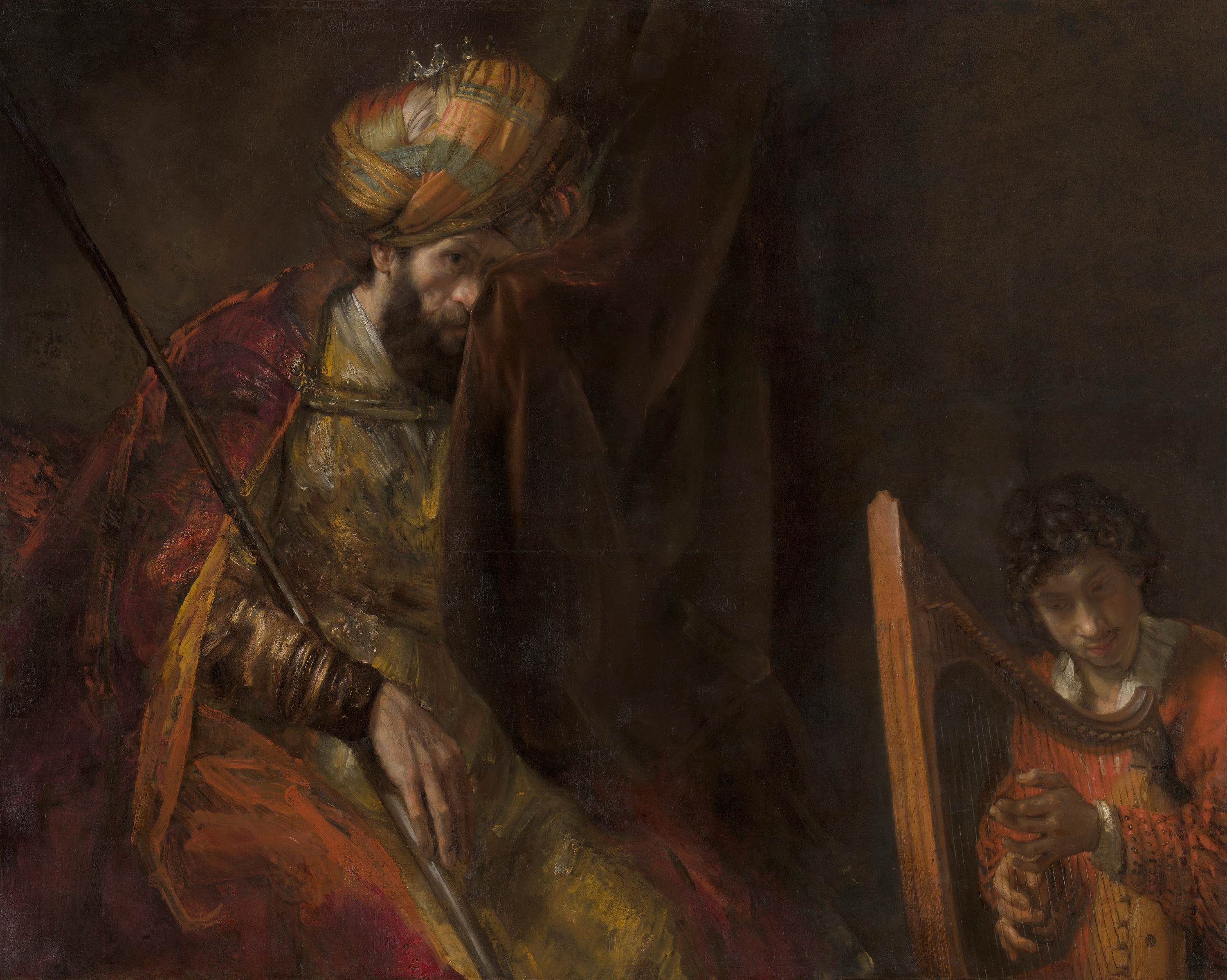
- "Saul and David (II)" (Note: Discusses Rembrandt's painting Saul and David (ca. 1653). Rembrandt - Saul and David)
- "Diaz's Forest" (Note: Discusses Narcisse Virgilio Diaz's painting The Forest Clearing (1875). The prose piece and artwork was re-published as free open access at The Guardian.)
- "The Artist"
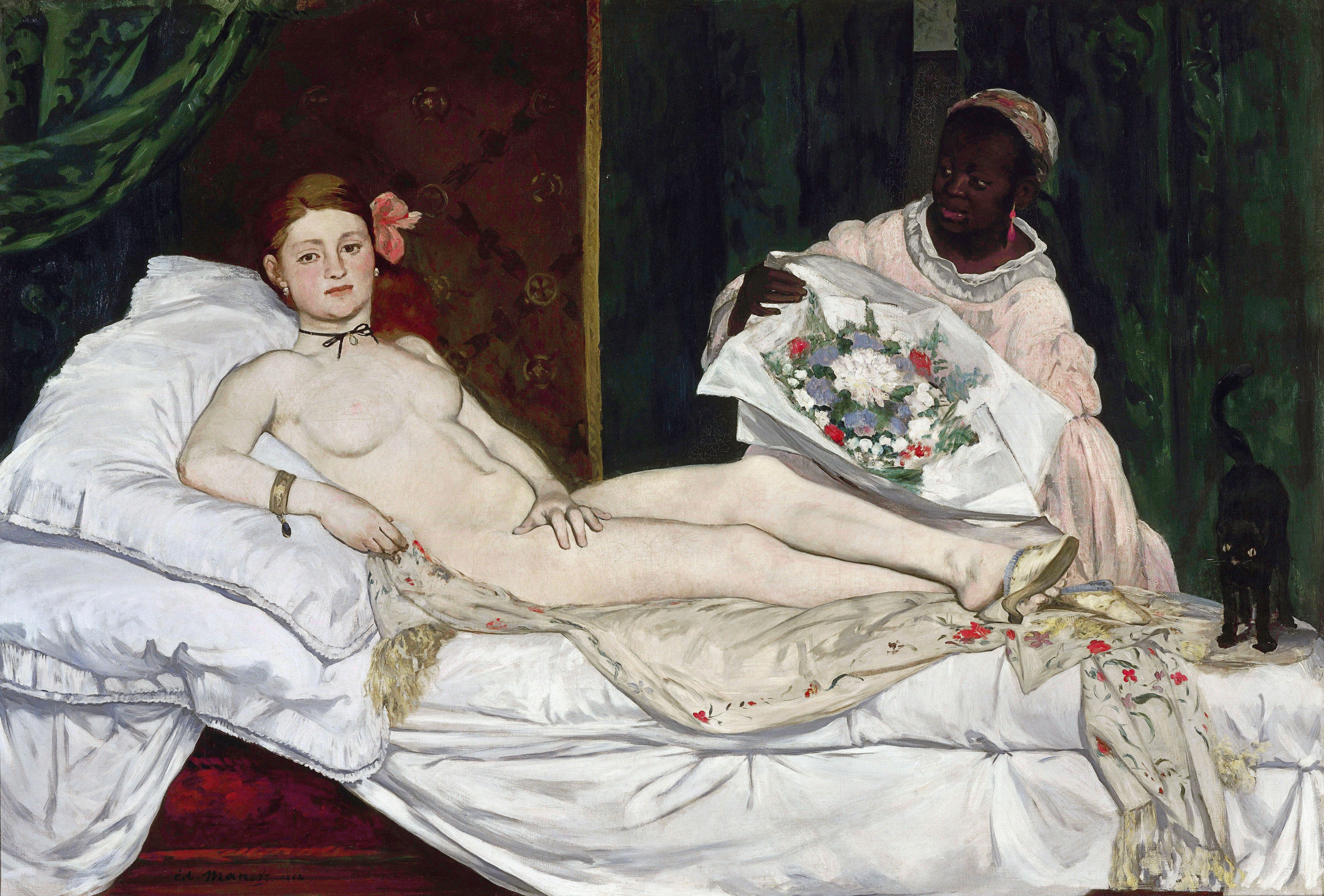
- "Olympia" (Note: Re: Édouard Manet's 1863 painting Olympia Manet - Olympia (1863). The narrator has a conversation with a woman in the painting.)
- "Come here, beloved new fresh beautiful tale of a painter" (Note: From a microscript composed in 1924, and not published in Walser's lifetime, hence being titled after the first line. The piece describes two women, the wife of a painter ("Zahler") and the Lady of the Manor, showing each other their knickers, which results in the Lady of the Manor getting her portrait painted by the husband.)
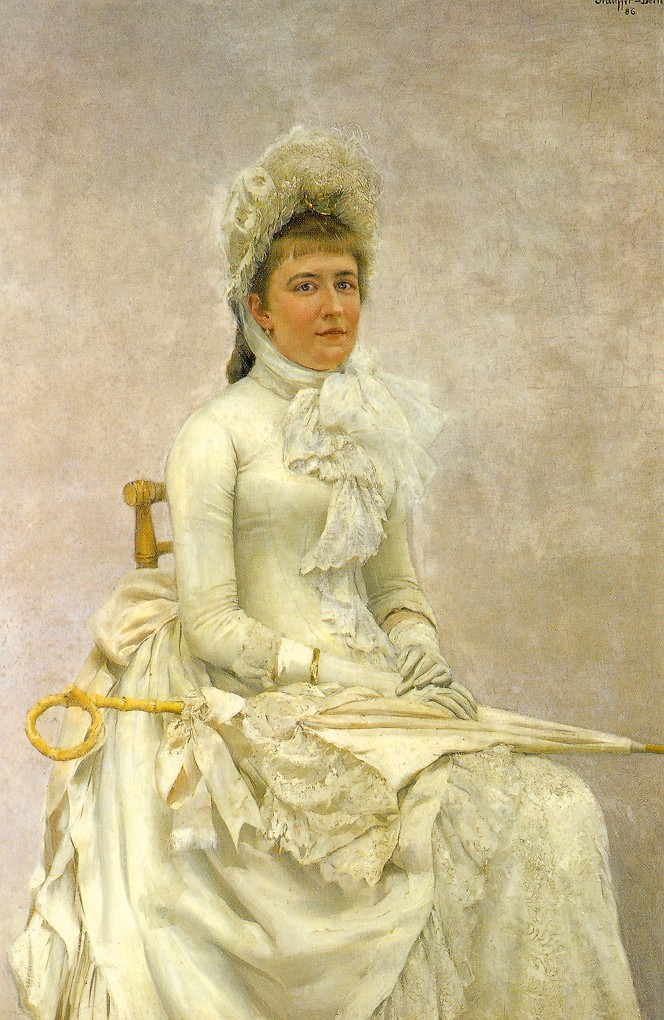
- "Scene from the Life of the Painter Karl Stauffer-Bern" (Note: Re: the painter Karl Stauffer-Bern, who had an affair that led to his imprisonment and suicide, plus the suicide of the woman he had the affair with, Lydia Welti, which all occurred when Walser was a child. The book reprints Stauffer-Bern's portrait of Lydia Welti Stauffer-Bern - Lydia Welti.)
- "Among other things he painted Madame his Mama" (Note: From a microscript. The piece alludes to an artist who had a life of "grievousness obtained, one might say, in the district of commerce ministers' wives" among other details. The narrator says at one point, "Thank God no one will suspect whom we're talking about.") (1925)
- "Aubrey Beardsley" (Note: The book re-prints an 1892 self-portrait by Aubrey Beardsley Aubrey Beardsley - Self-portrait. The narrator muses on Beardsley himself, extrapolates about his personality from his art, and also says: "Today he seems to have been somewhat forgotten. Well, then these lines will recall him. It is pleasant to talk about someone who does not form the conversation of the day." The prose piece and self-portrait are re-published as free open access at The Guardian) (1926)
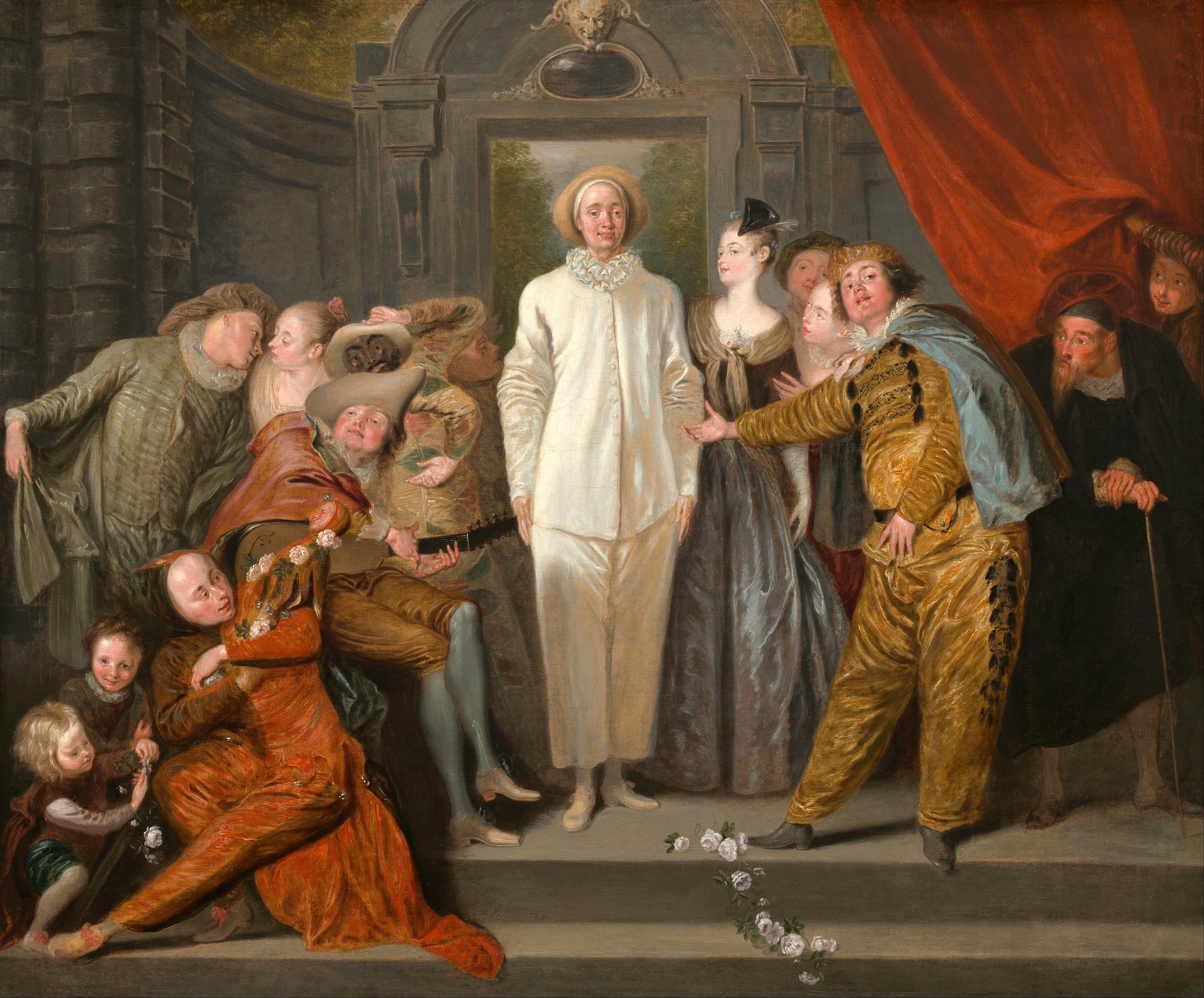
- "A Tiny Little Bit of Watteau" (Note: Watteau - The Italian Comedians Re: Jean-Antoine Watteau's painting The Italian Comedians. Written in the form of a stage play in which the characters give monologs about themselves. The script names the central figure "The Indifferent Man", and the man extending his arm gives a monolog including the lines: "[...] perhaps only I myself find [my feelings] comprehensible. I can stick out my arm, and then it lives as if mum--a mummer--in the immobility of its extension, and my moonlight face displays a rollicking gauntness [...].")
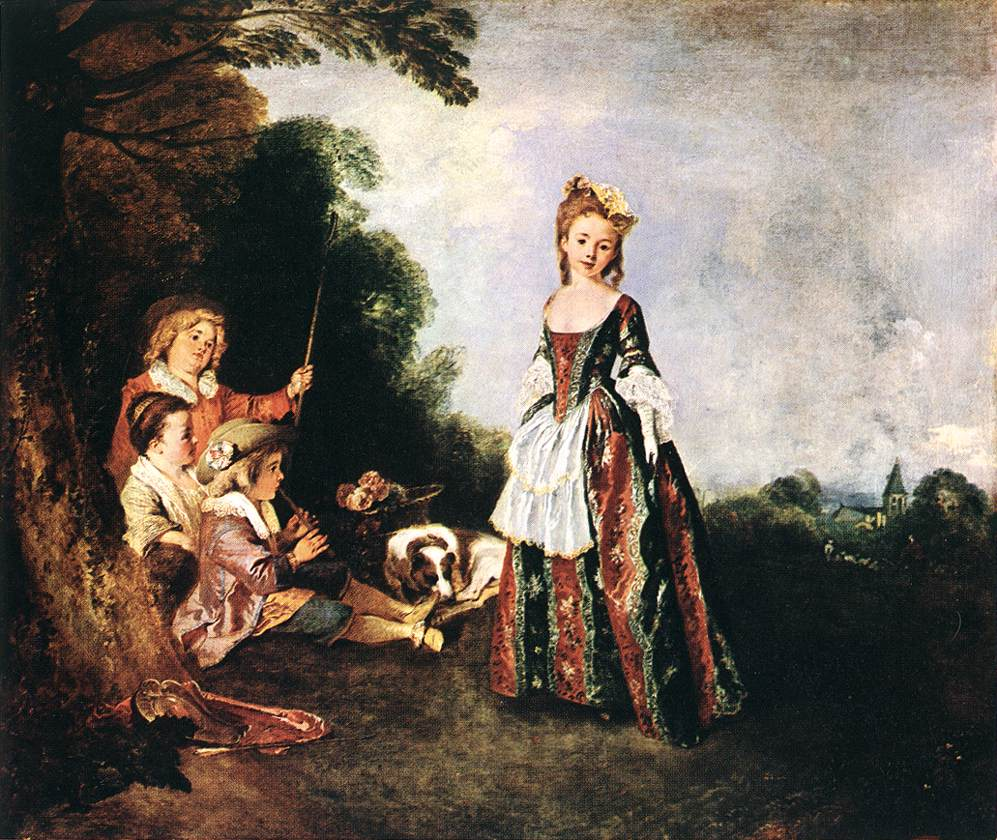
- "Watteau" (Note: Watteau - The Dance Discusses Antoine Watteau himself and his painting The Dance (1716))
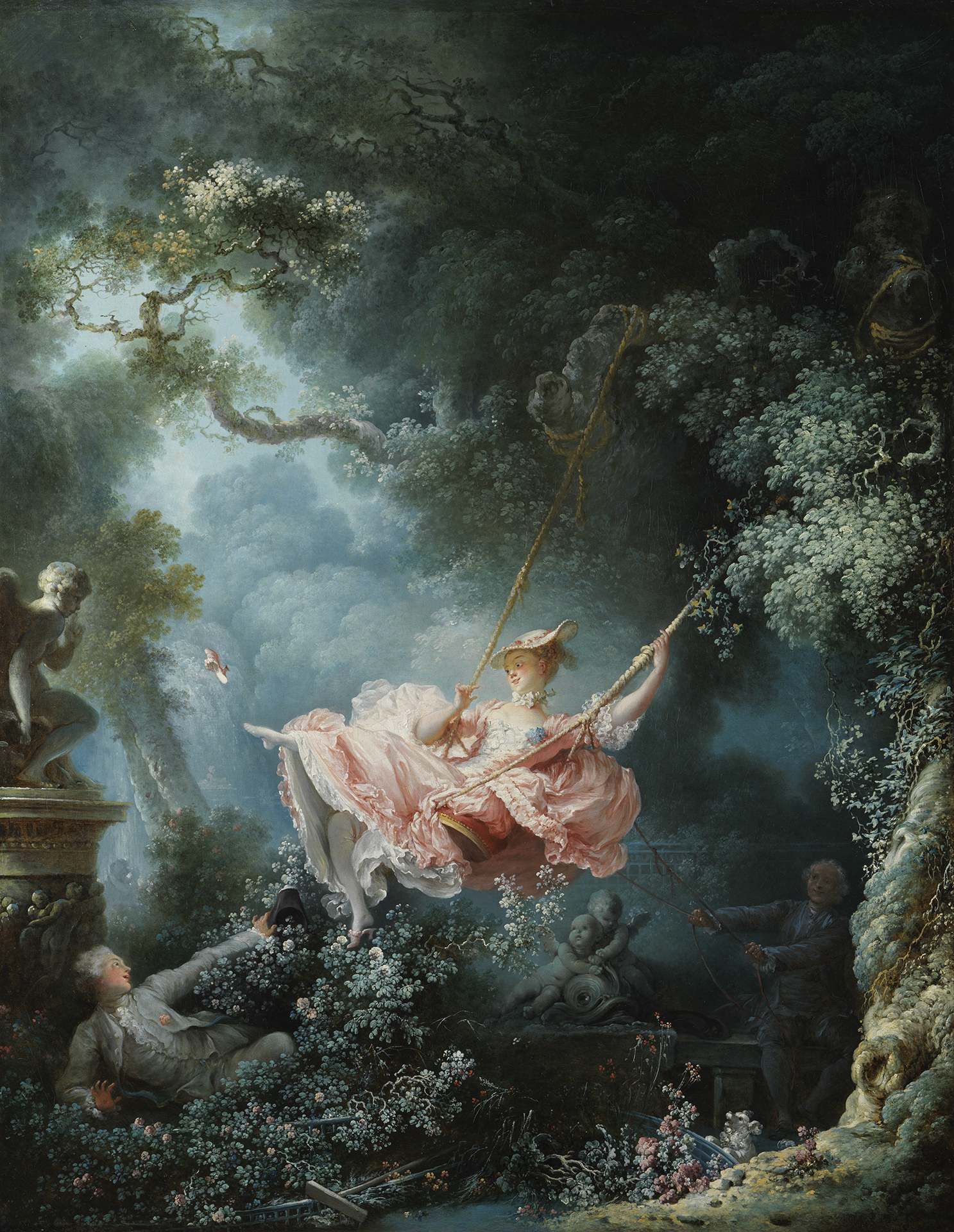
- "A Picture by Jean-Honoré Fragonard" (Note: Fragonard - The Happy Accidents of the Swing (1767) Re: Fragonard's 1767 painting known as The Swing.)
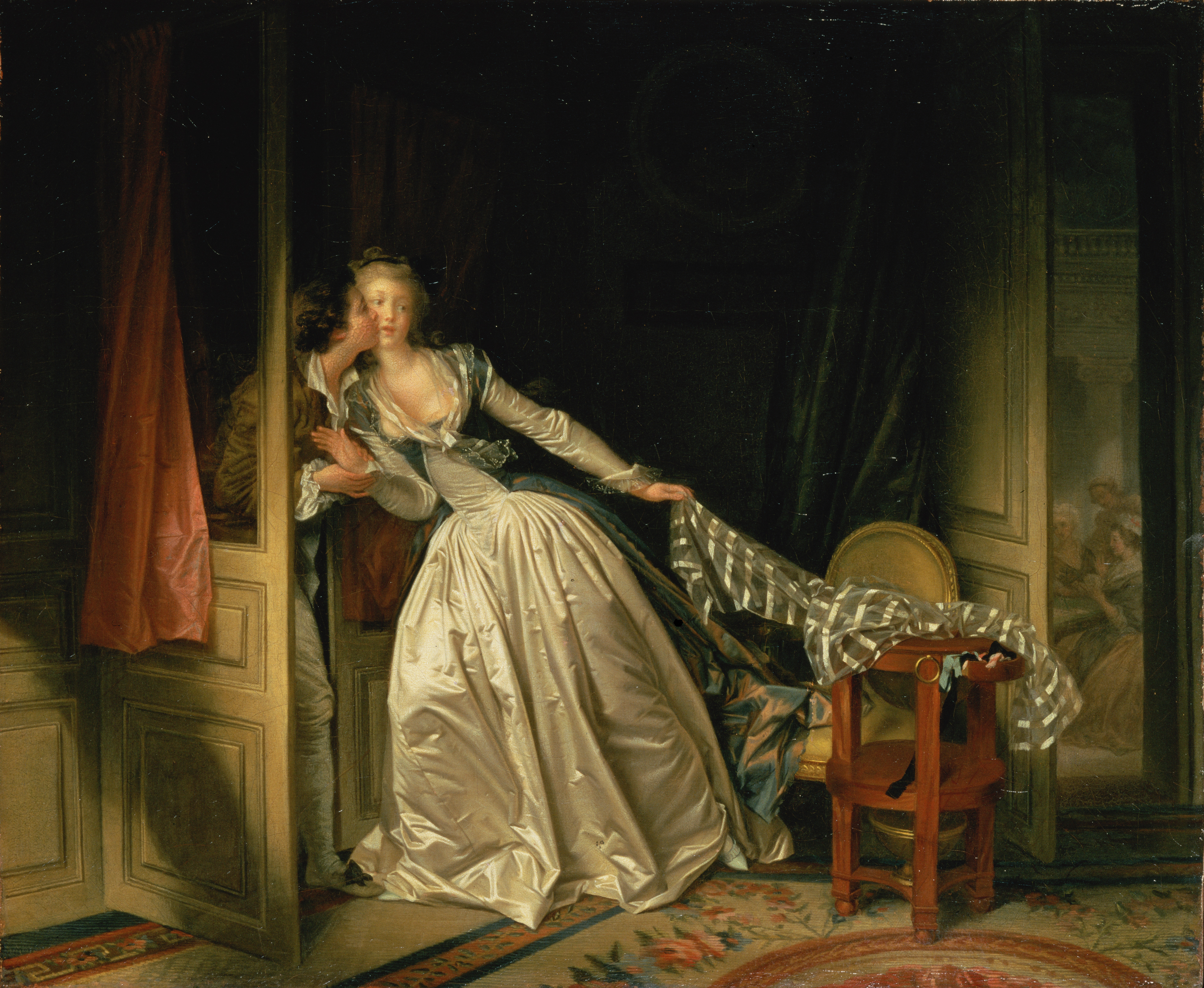
- "The Kiss (III)" (Note: Fragonard - The Stolen Kiss (1787) Re: The Stolen Kiss, circa 1787, by Jean-Honoré Fragonard. The prose piece and artwork were re-published for free open access at The Nation.)
- "A Discussion of a Picture" (Note: The prose piece and the book don't specify the painting, but the narrator says about the work: it dates from the 1870's, "from the age of the Brothers Goncourt, from the heyday of Emile Zola", it might remind a person of Flaubert's character Madame Arnoux from Sentimental Education, the woman is sitting at a table near a mirror, and the wallpaper is pale green.) (1926)
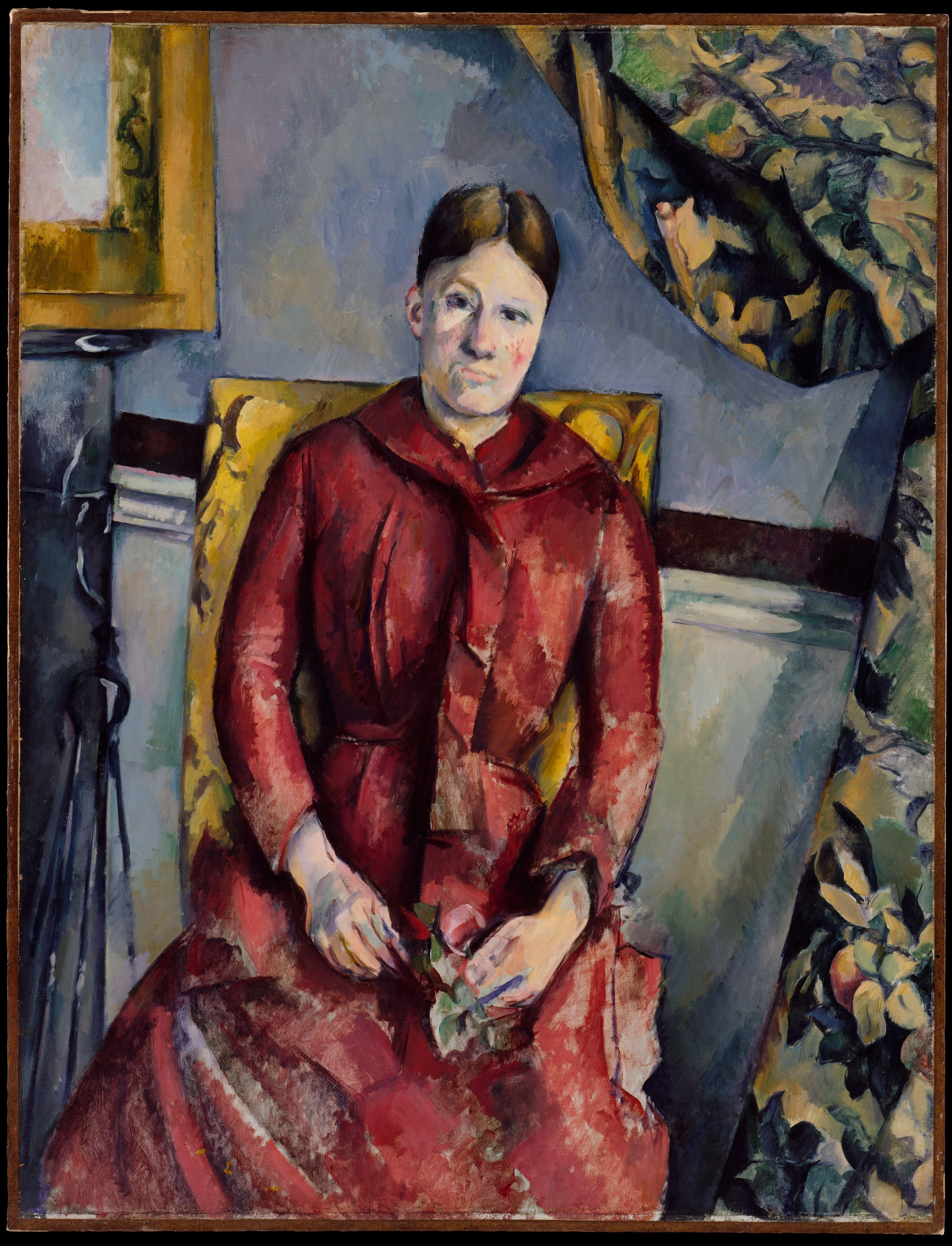
- "Thoughts on Cezanne" (Note: Cezanne - Madame Cezanne (ca. 1888) Re: Paul Cezanne's works and artistic persona in general, with commentary on his images of fruits, wines, etc. The narrator states, "One might keep an eye on the peculiarity that he looked upon his wife as if she were a fruit on the tablecloth. For him the outlines, the contours of his wife were exactly the same simple but also complicated ones as he'll have seen around flowers, glasses, dishes, knives, forks, tablecloths, fruits, and coffeepots and cups. A pat of butter was for him just as significant as a delicate pleat corrugating his wife's dress. I recognize that my wording here is inadequate [...]." The book presents an image of Cezanne's 1888 portrait of his wife.) (1929)

== Footnotes ==
Translators
