= Les Arènes =

1888 painting by Vincent van Gogh

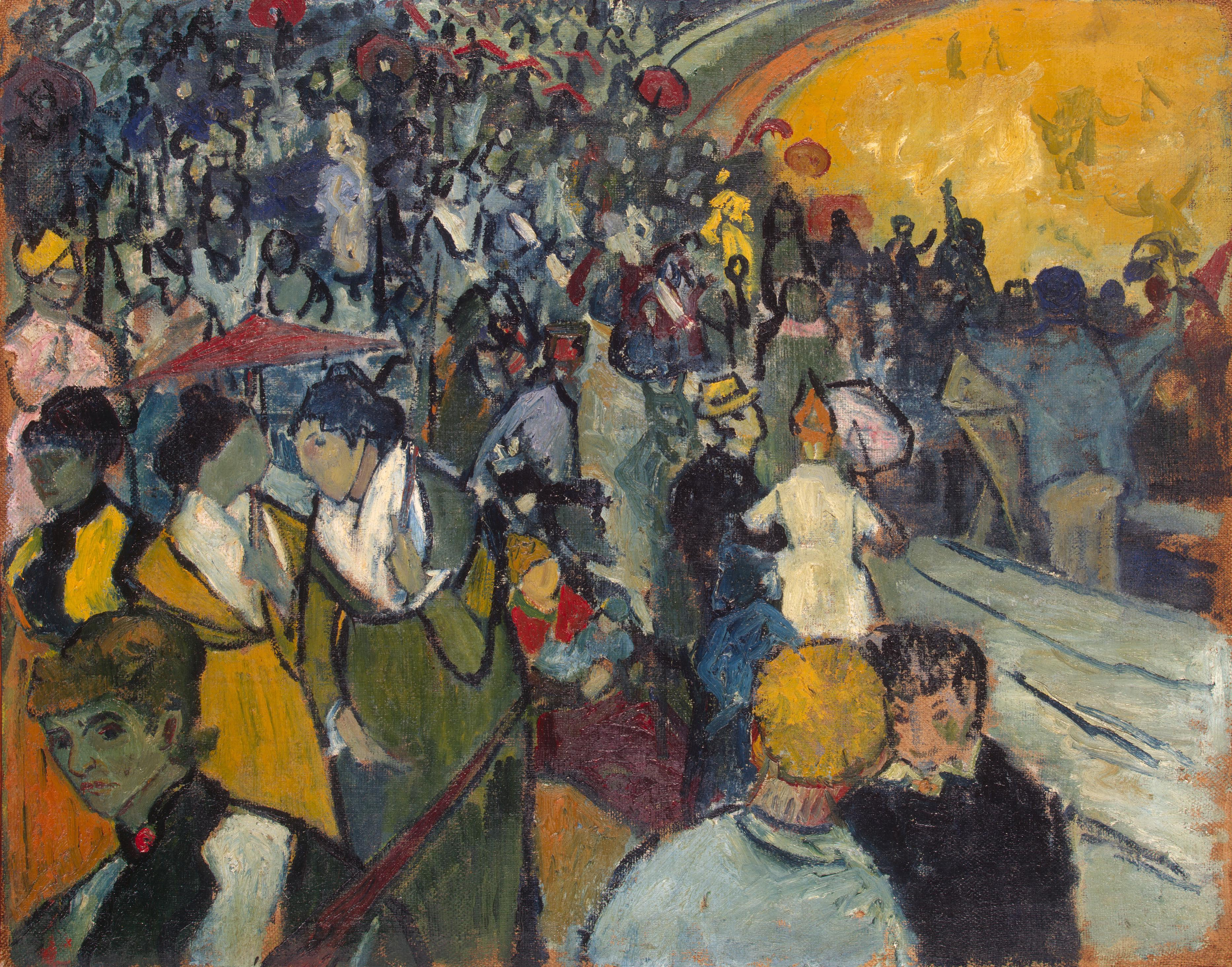
- Artist: Vincent van Gogh
- Year: 1888
- Catalogue: F548; JH1653
- Medium: Oil on canvas
- Dimensions: 73.5 cm × 91.5 cm (28.9 in × 36 in)
- Location: Hermitage Museum; St. Petersburg

Les Arènes is a painting by Vincent van Gogh executed in Arles, in November or December 1888, during the period of time when Paul Gauguin was living with him in The Yellow House. The bullfight season in Arles that year started on Easter Sunday 1 April and ended on 21 October. Van Gogh's painting is therefore not a study of nature but done from memory. Gauguin encouraged van Gogh to work in the studio in this manner. The painting may not be finished as the paint is very thinly applied, and patches of bare jute show through in places.

It seems that members of the Roulin Family are depicted in this portrait, and the woman in Arlésienne costume has the profile of Madame Ginoux.

A matter of weeks after painting this canvas, van Gogh cut off part of his own ear. One of the many theories about this notorious incident is that the bullfights (or "bull games" as they are called in Arles) made a deep impression on van Gogh, in particular the custom of severing one ear of a defeated bull. The victorious matador circles the arena displaying this prize to the crowd, before presenting it to a lady of his choice. There is some doubt as to whether the bulls were killed in this fashion in Arles in van Gogh's time.

== See also ==
- Arles Amphitheatre
- List of works by Vincent van Gogh
