= Saul and David (painting) =

17th-century painting by Rembrandt van Rijn

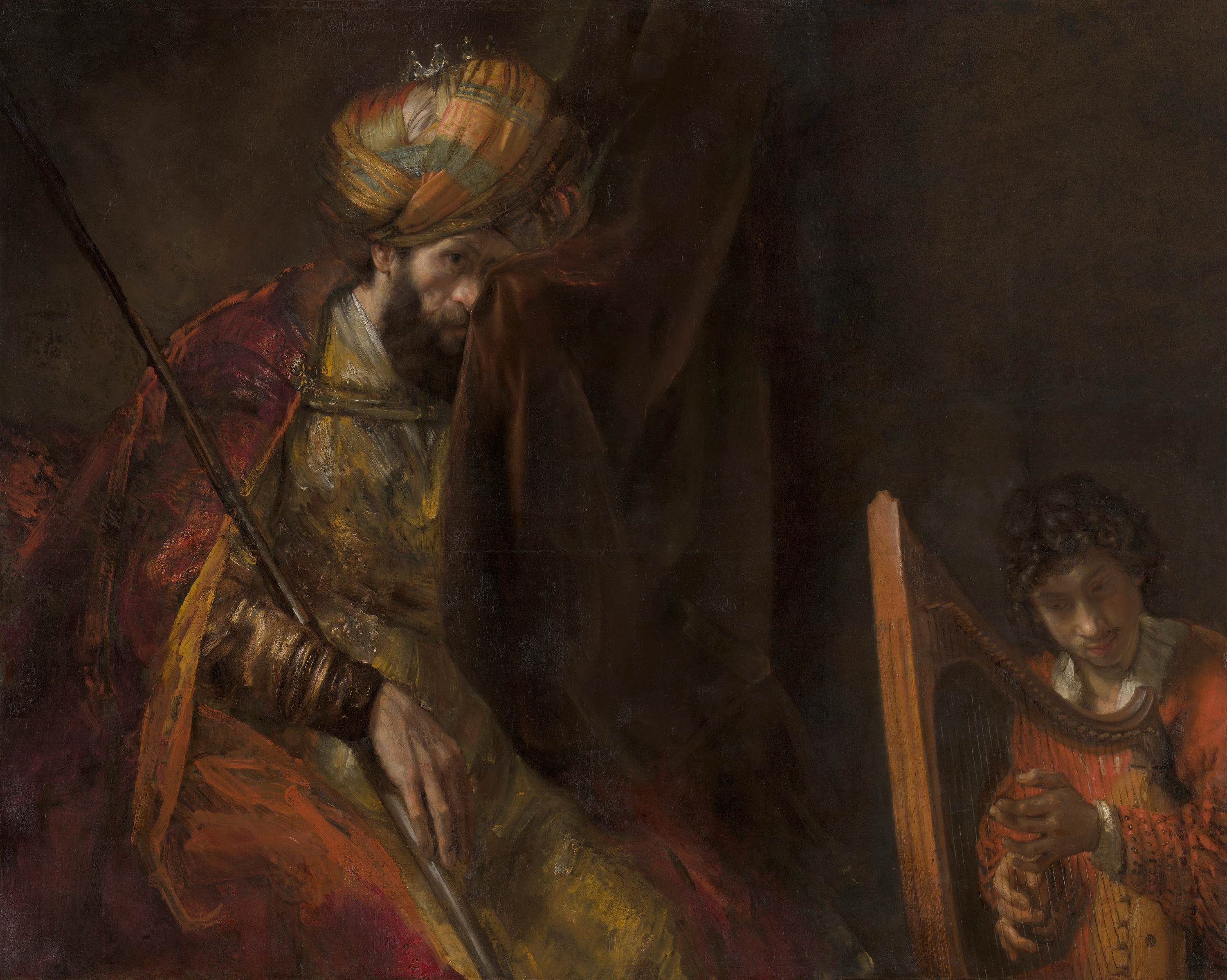

Saul and David is an oil-on-canvas painting by Rembrandt and/or his studio, now in the Mauritshuis and dated to between 1651 and 1658.

== Depictions ==
The painting depicts Saul, the king of the Israelites. He is visibly touched by the harp playing. The depicted situation comes from 1 Samuel 16:14–23 and 1 Samuel 18:8–11, in which King Saul is abandoned by the Holy Spirit, and God sends him an evil spirit. It taunts Saul, and only David's harp playing can relax him. Later David married Michal, one of Saul's daughters. He eventually succeeded his father-in-law as King of the Israelites.

== 19th century modifications ==
The painting was originally larger, but in the 19th century the canvas was cut into two unequal pieces – possibly to be sold as separate paintings. The pieces were later reattached to each other.

== See also ==
- List of paintings by Rembrandt

== Sources ==
- Rembrandt: The Case of Saul and David
- http://www.mauritshuis.nl/nl-nl/verdiep/de-collectie/kunstwerken/saul-en-david-621/detailgegevens/
