= L'Arlésienne (painting) =

Six similar paintings by Vincent van Gogh

- Portrait of Madame Ginoux (English)
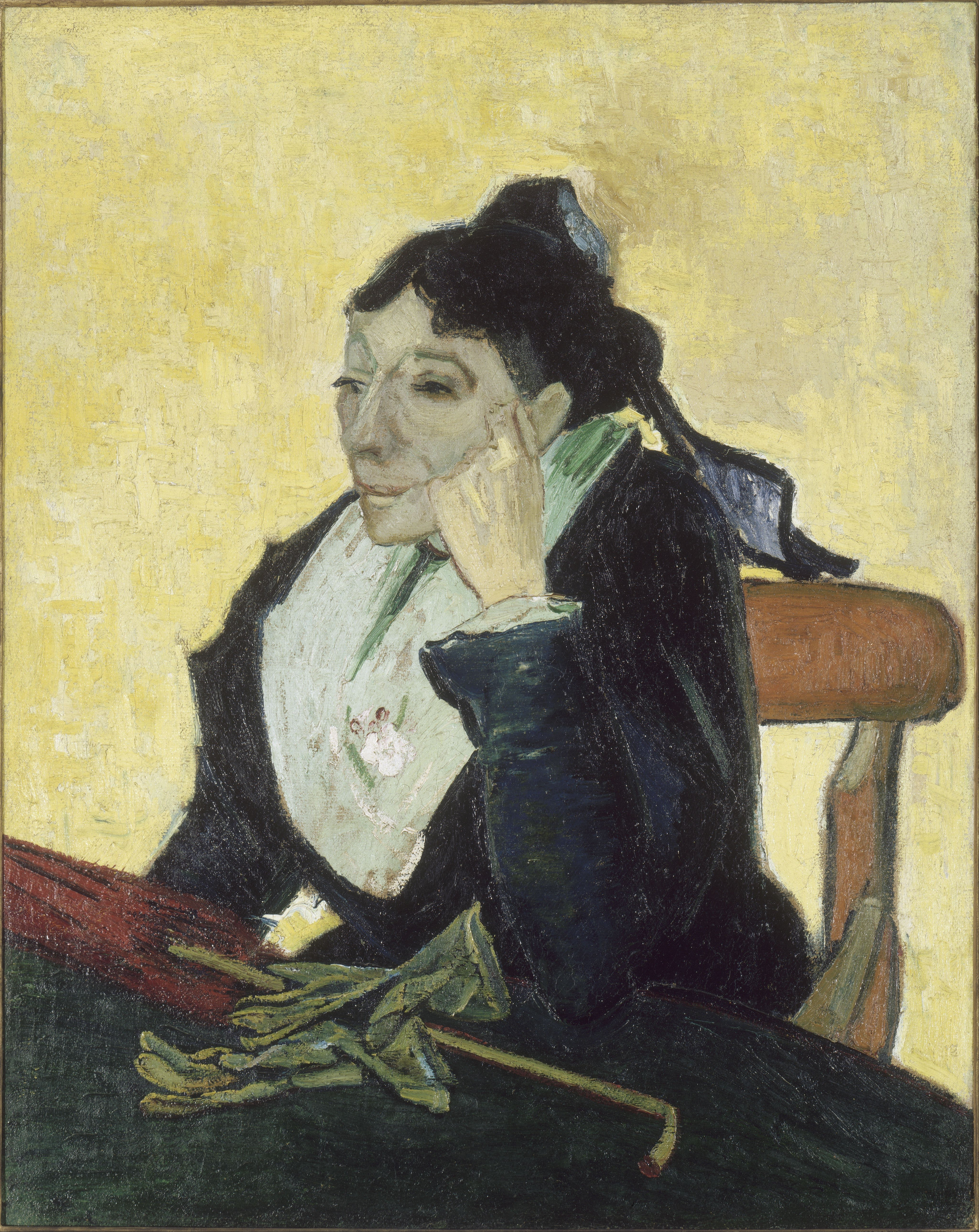
- Artist: Vincent van Gogh
- Year: 1888
- Catalogue: F489; JH1625
- Medium: Oil on canvas
- Dimensions: 92.5 cm × 73.5 cm (36.4 in × 28.9 in)
- Location: Musée d'Orsay, Paris

L'Arlésienne, L'Arlésienne : Madame Ginoux, or Portrait of Madame Ginoux is the title given to a group of six similar paintings by Vincent van Gogh, painted in Arles, November 1888 (or later), and in Saint-Rémy, February 1890. L'Arlésienne (French pronunciation: [laʁlezjɛn]) means literally "the woman from Arles".

The subject, Marie Jullian (or Julien), was born in Arles June 8, 1848 and died there August 2, 1911. She married Joseph-Michel Ginoux in 1866 and together they ran the Café de la Gare, 30 Place Lamartine, where van Gogh lodged from May to mid-September 1888. He had the Yellow House in Arles furnished to settle there.

Evidently until this time, van Gogh's relations to M. and Mme. Ginoux had remained more or less commercial (the café is the subject of The Night Café), but Gauguin's arrival in Arles altered the situation. His courtship charmed the lady, then about 40 years of age, and in the first few days of November 1888 Madame Ginoux agreed to have a portrait session for Gauguin, and his friend van Gogh. Within an hour, Gauguin produced a charcoal drawing while Vincent produced a full-scale painting, "knocked off in one hour".

== November 1888 version and its repetition ==
Van Gogh's first version, now in the Musée d'Orsay, Paris, is painted on burlap. A complete piece of this fabric was acquired by Gauguin just after his arrival in Arles, and used by both artists in November and December 1888.

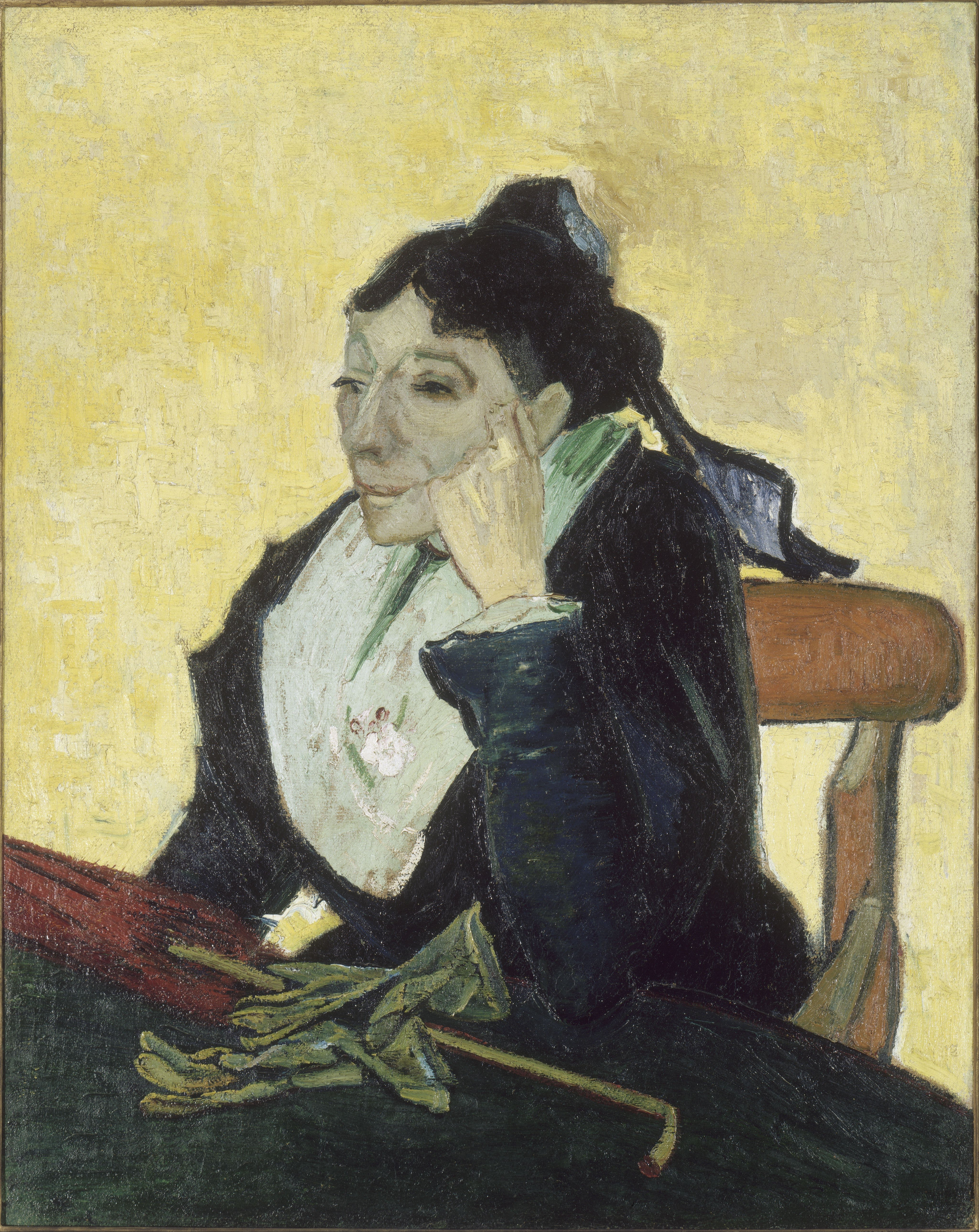
L'Arlésienne: Madame Ginoux with gloves and umbrella. Oil on canvas (burlap), 92.5 x 73.5 cm, Musée d'Orsay, Paris

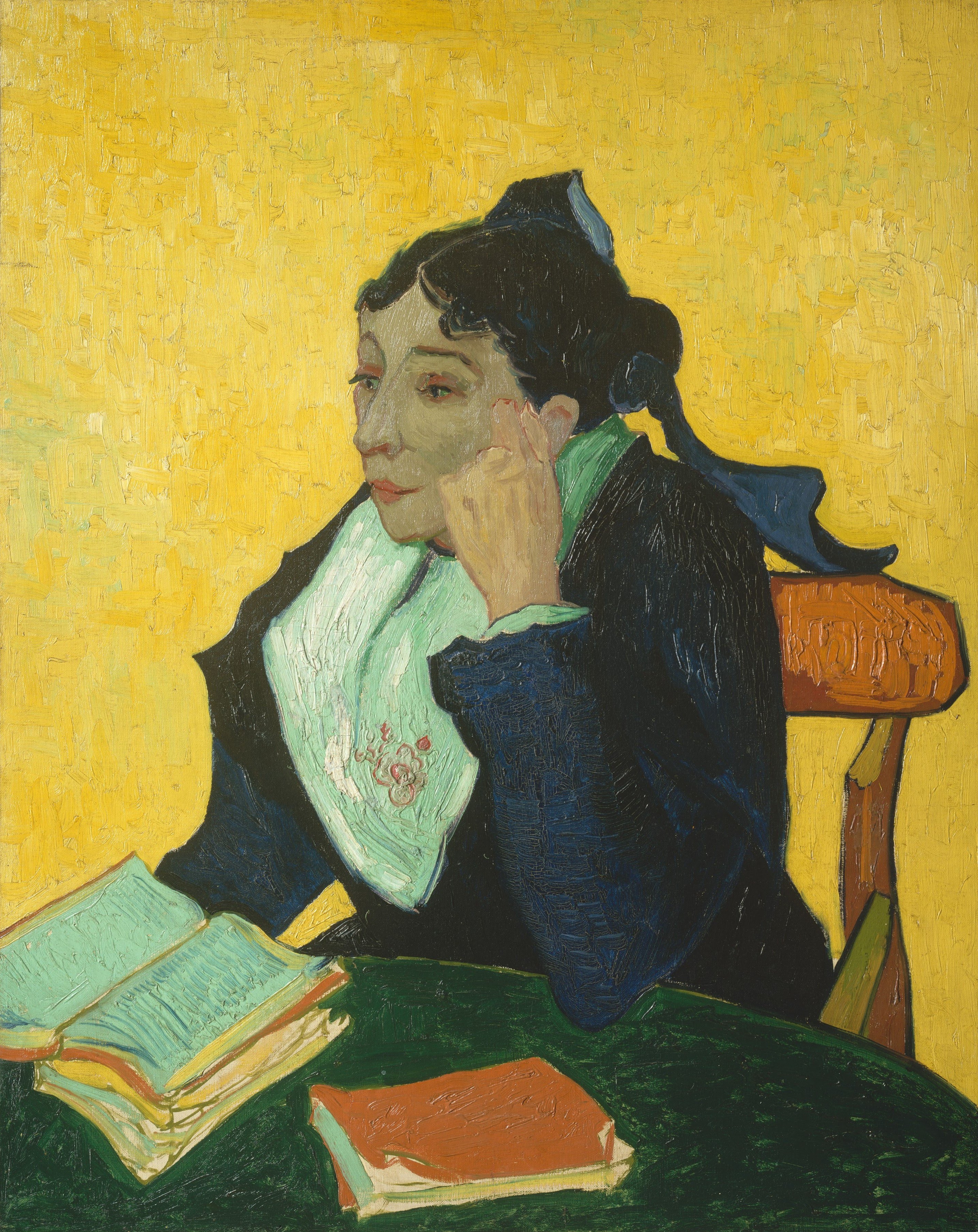
L'Arlésienne: Madame Ginoux with books. Oil on canvas, 91.5 x 73.7 cm, Metropolitan Museum of Art, New York

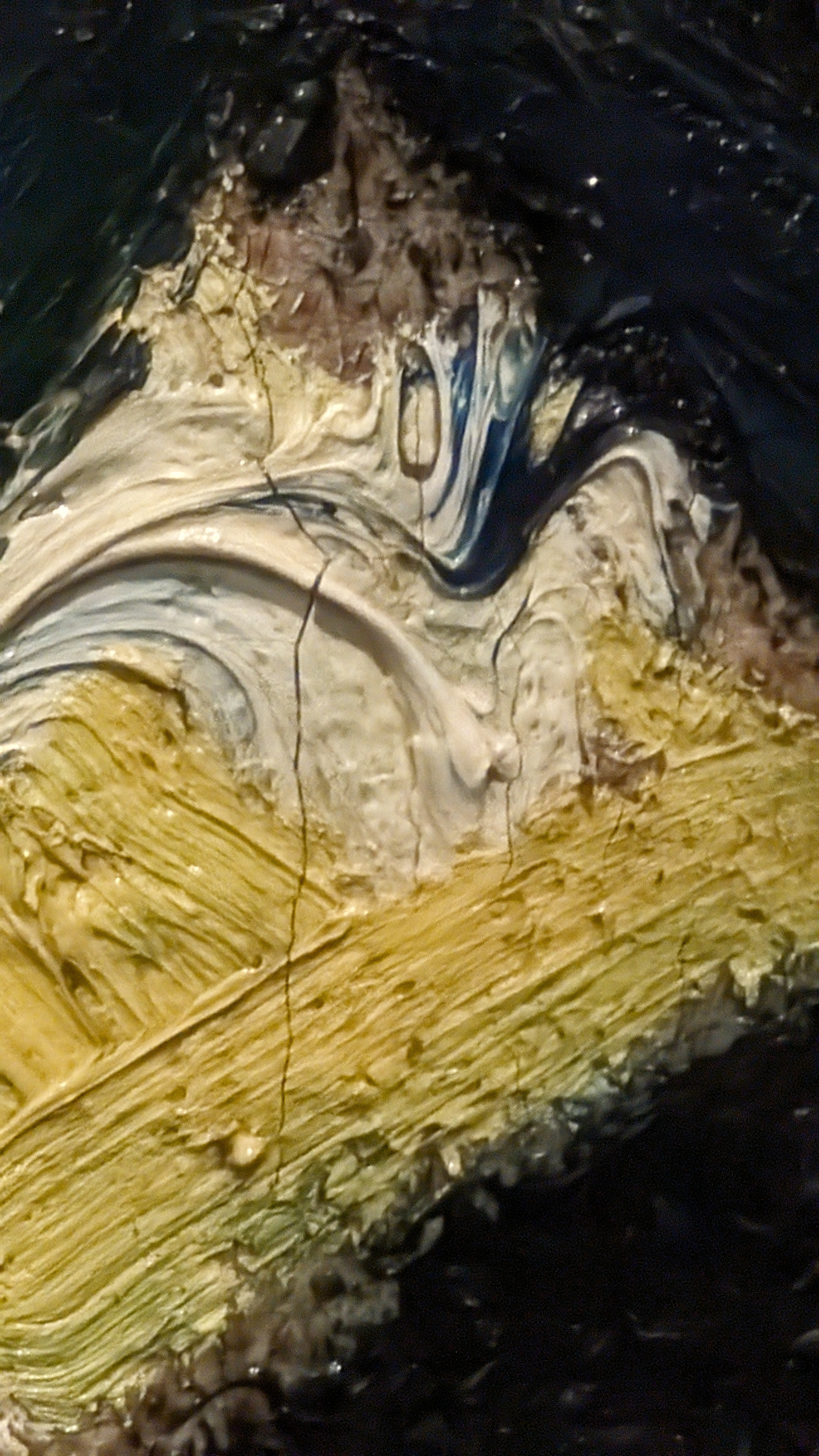
Detail of L'Arlésienne (Musée d'Orsay)

For the second version, now in the Metropolitan Museum of Art in New York City, van Gogh again painted on the commercially pre-primed canvas he had previously used, and he replaced the gloves and umbrella with three books.

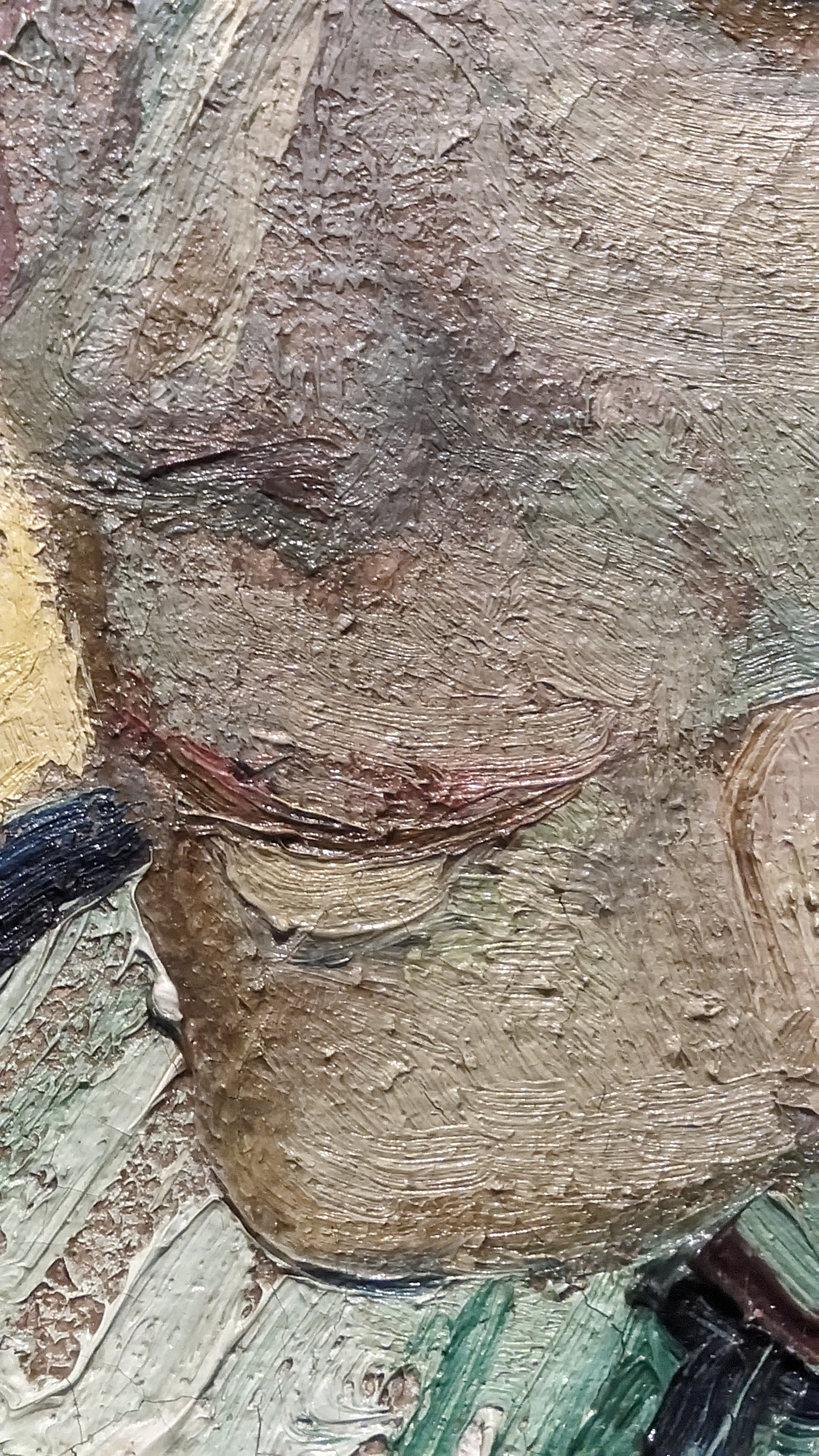
Detail of L'Arlésienne (Musée d'Orsay)

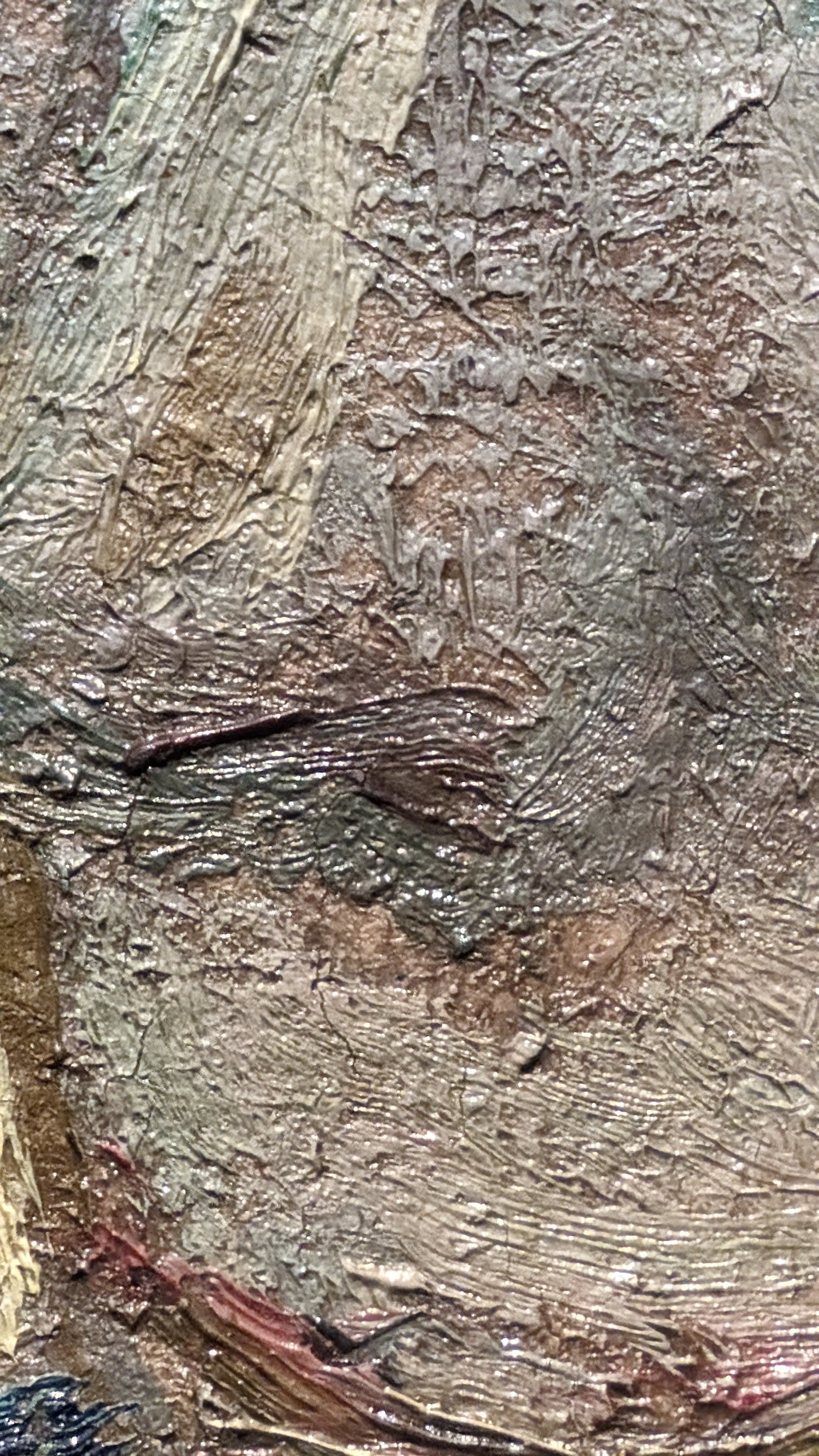
Detail of L'Arlésienne (Musée d'Orsay)

== February 1890 versions ==
While in the asylum at Saint-Rémy, van Gogh painted another five portraits of Madame Ginoux, based on Gauguin's charcoal drawing of November 1888. Of these, one was intended for Gauguin, one for his brother Theo, one for himself and one for Madame Ginoux. The provenance of the version in the Kröller-Müller Museum is not known in detail, but the painting is known to have been previously owned by Albert Aurier, an early champion of Vincent's paintings. The version intended for Madame Ginoux was lost and has not been recovered. This is the version Vincent was delivering to Madame Ginoux in Arles when he suffered his relapse on February 22, 1890. In an unfinished letter to Gauguin that was never sent, Vincent remarked that working on her portrait cost him another month of illness. Gauguin's version was the one with a pink background, currently in the São Paulo Museum of Art. Gauguin was enthusiastic about the portrait, writing:

I've seen the canvas of Madame Ginoux. Very fine and very curious, I like it better than my drawing. Despite your ailing state you have never worked with so much balance while conserving the sensation and the interior warmth needed for a work of art, precisely in an era when art is a business regulated in advance by cold calculations.

In a letter to his sister Wil, dated 5 June 1890, Vincent set out his philosophy for doing portraits: "I should like to do portraits which will appear as revelations to people in a hundred years' time. In other words I am not trying to achieve this by photographic likeness but by rendering our impassioned expressions, by using our modern knowledge and appreciation of colour as a means of rendering and exalting character ... The portrait of the Arlésienne has a colourless and matt flesh tone, the eyes are calm and very simple, the clothing is black, the background pink, and she is leaning on a green table with green books. But in the copy that Theo has, the clothing is pink, the background yellowy-white, and the front of the open bodice is muslin in a white that merges into green. Among all these light colours, only the hair, the eyelashes and the eyes form black patches."

In 1899, Henri Matisse wanted to buy the version with a pink background, which was on sale for 150 francs, and wrote to his brother Auguste asking for money. However, Auguste was unable to provide the money as he recently bought an Acatène bicycle. Matisse raised the money over the course of six weeks and came to buy the painting, but by then the price was raised to 450 francs.

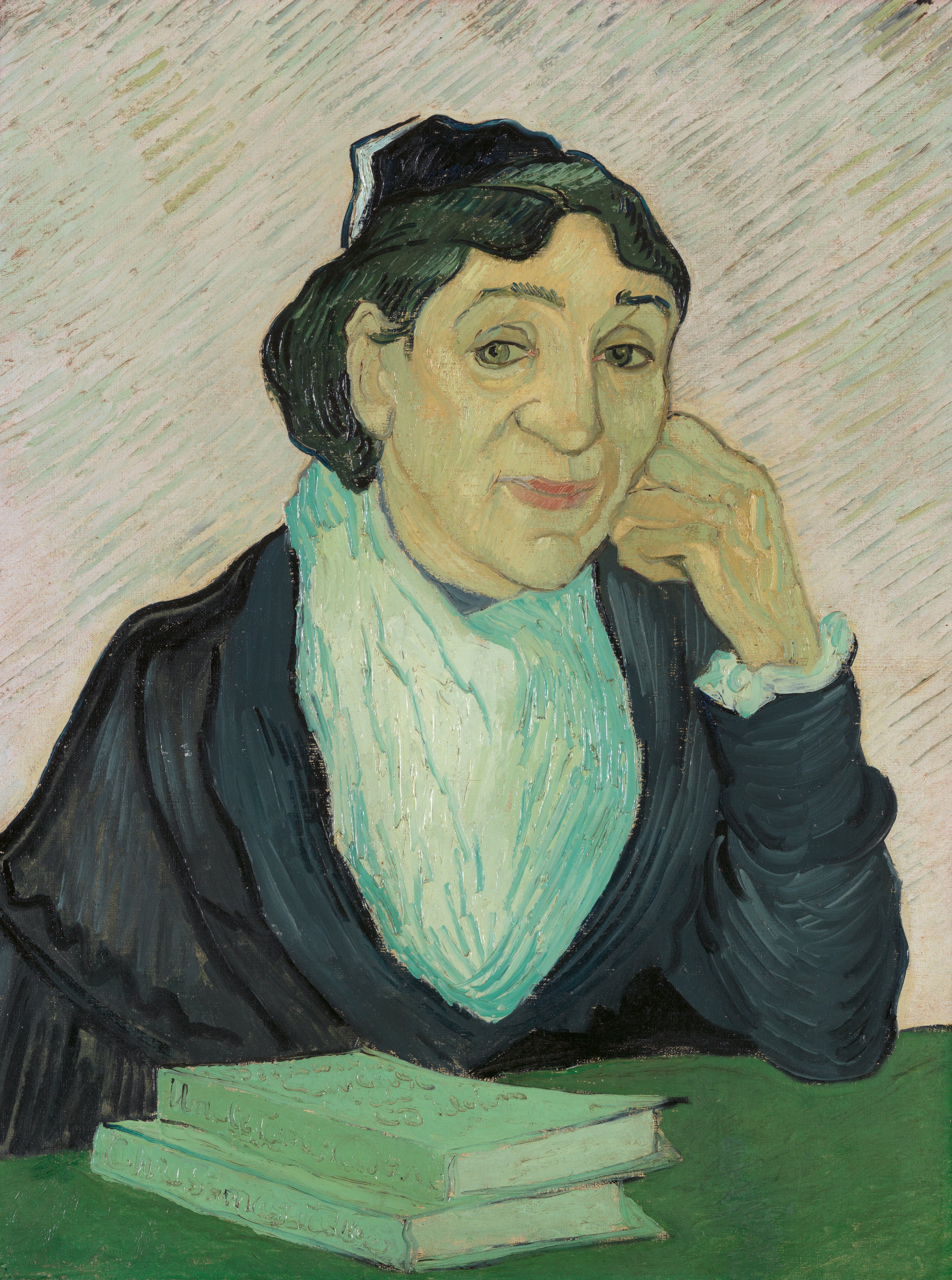
L'Arlésienne, Kröller-Müller Museum, Otterlo

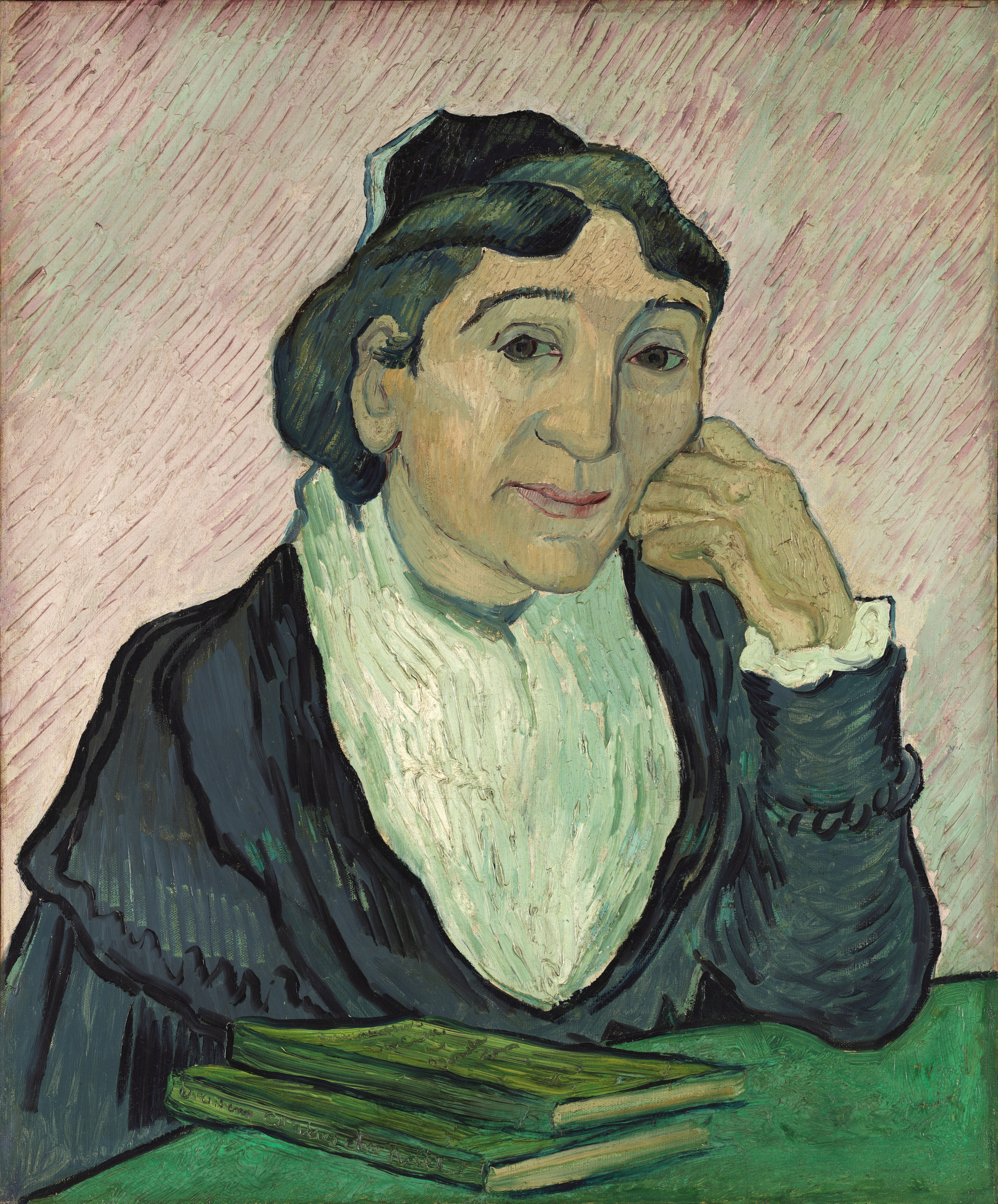
L'Arlésienne, Galleria Nazionale d'Arte Moderna, Rome

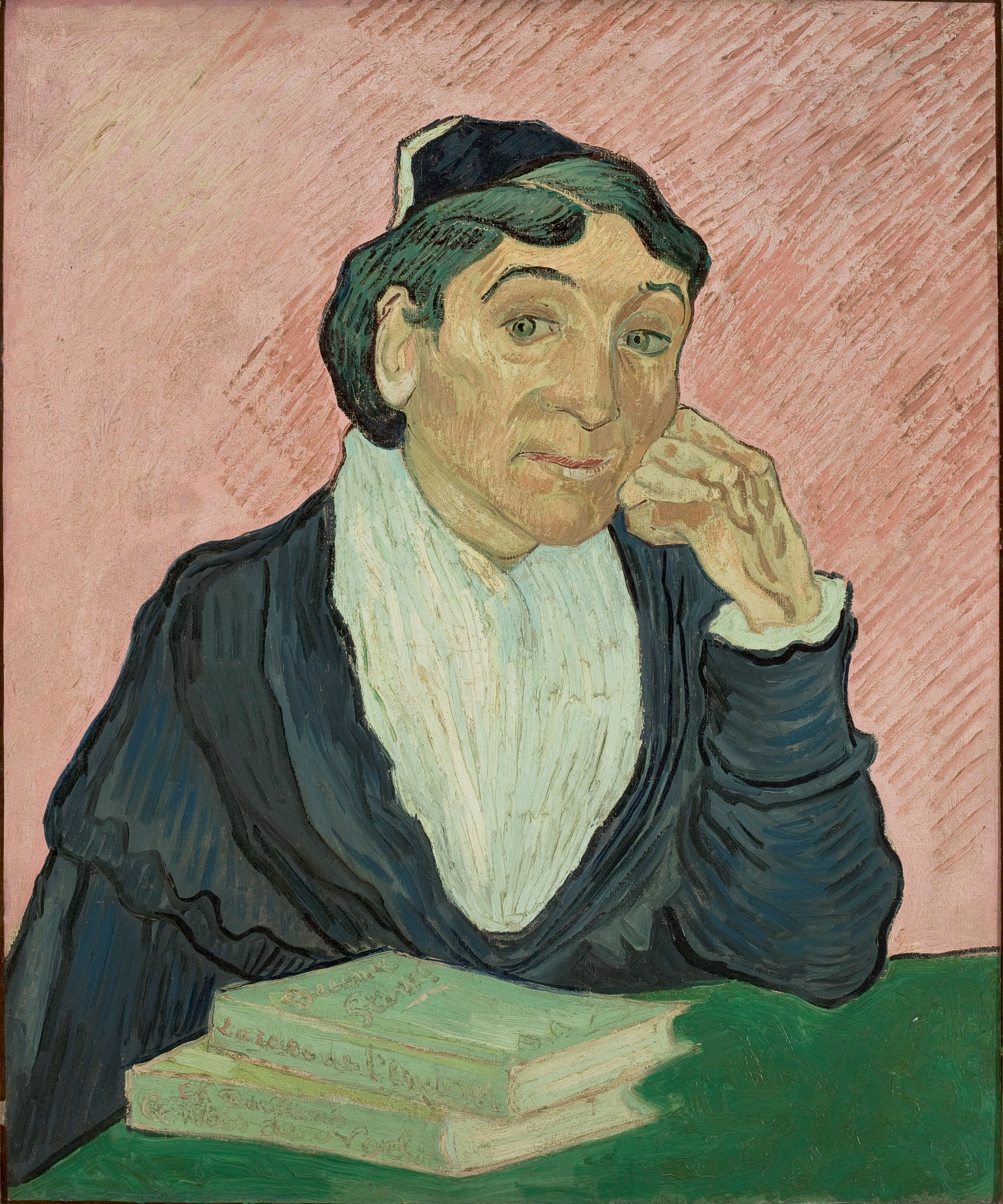
L'Arlésienne, São Paulo Museum of Art

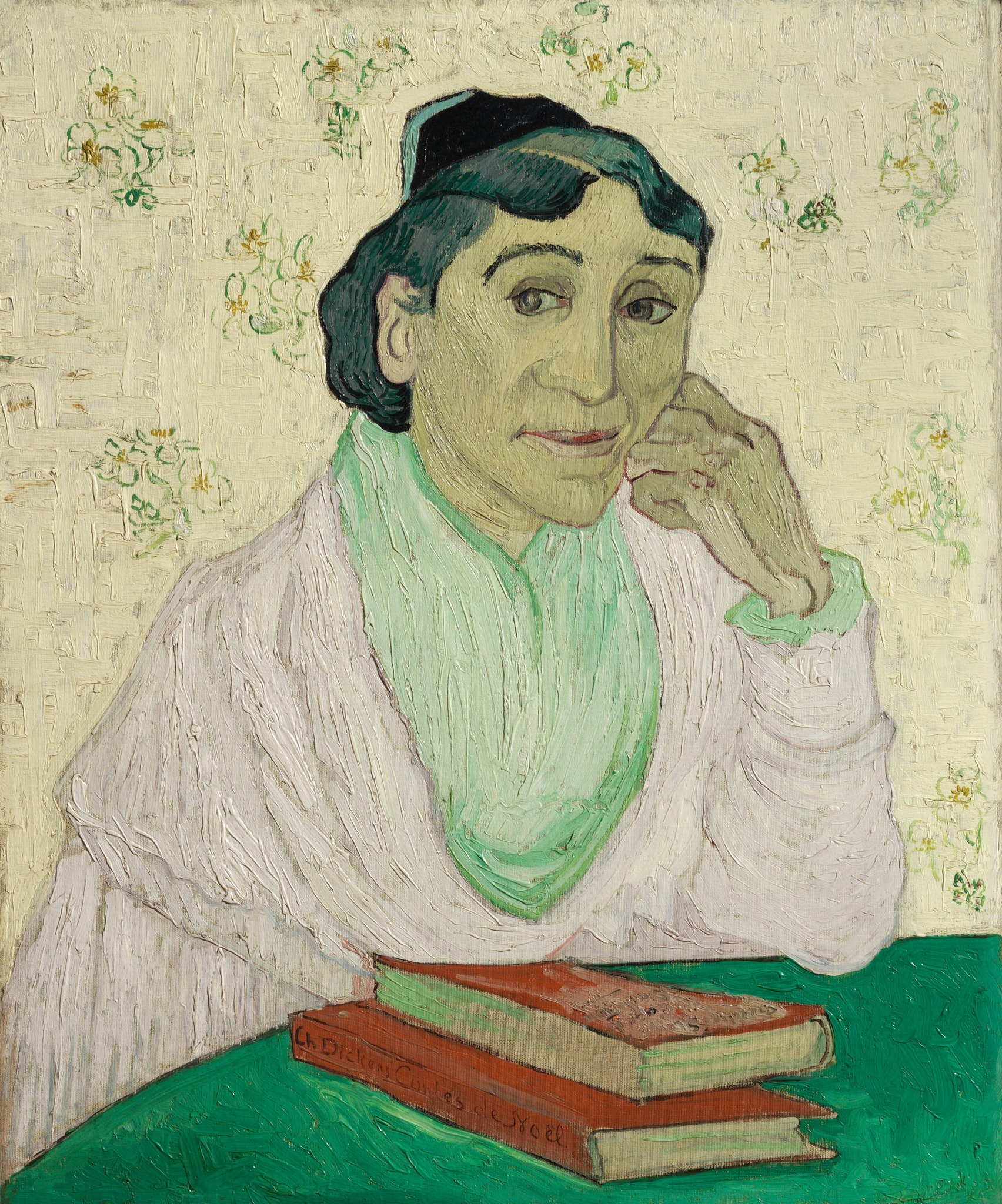
L'Arlésienne, private collection

On 2 May 2006, the painting with the floral background sold at auction at Christie's, New York, for more than $40 million (USD). This was the version that Vincent gave to Theo.

== Gauguin's versions ==
Gauguin produced a charcoal sketch at the original sitting of Madame Ginoux in November 1888, and later produced a canvas, Café de Nuit, Arles, which features Mme. Ginoux in her and her husband's café.

L'Arlésienne, Madame Ginoux, Paul Gauguin, 1888.

Café de Nuit, Arles, Paul Gauguin, 1888.

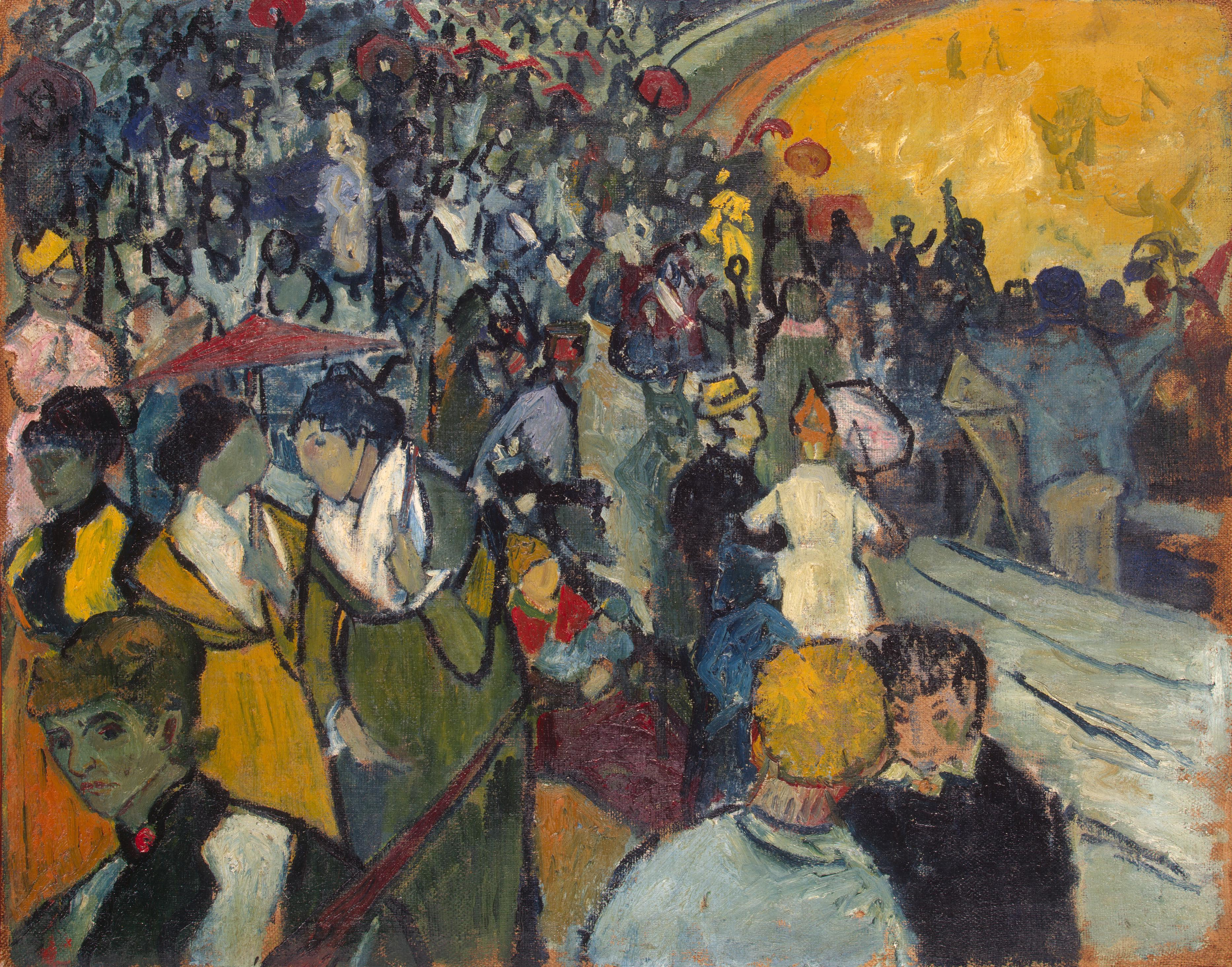
Vincent van Gogh, Les Arènes (December 1888) Hermitage Museum, St. Petersburg

== The Arena ==
Les Arènes, also painted during Gauguin's stay in Arles, is said to depict various real life subjects whom Van Gogh had encountered, including members of the Roulin Family and Madame Ginoux, whose profile can be seen in the woman in Arlésienne costume.

== References in culture ==
In the 1955 book Lolita, by Vladimir Nabokov, the narrator calls L'Arlésienne "that banal darling of the arty middle class".

== See also ==
- List of works by Vincent van Gogh

== Works cited ==
- Bailey, Martin (21 March 2025). "Matisse wanted to buy a Van Gogh portrait—instead, his brother bought a bicycle". The Art Newspaper. Archived from the original on 3 April 2025.
