= Bismarck =

Bismarck most often refers to:

- Otto von Bismarck (1815–1898), Prussian statesman and first Chancellor of Germany
- Bismarck, North Dakota, the capital of North Dakota, U.S.
- German battleship Bismarck, a 1939 German World War II battleship

Bismarck or Bismark may also refer to:

== Places ==
=== United States ===
- Bismarck, Arkansas
- Bismarck, Illinois
- Bismarck Township, Michigan
- Bismarck Township, Sibley County, Minnesota
- Bismarck, Missouri
- Bismarck, Nebraska
- Bismarck, North Dakota, the most populous place with the name
- Bismarck Municipal Airport, serving Bismarck, North Dakota
- Bismarck, West Virginia
- Bismark, Oklahoma, former name of present Wright City, Oklahoma; name changed during World War I

=== Oceania ===
- Bismarck Sea, north of New Guinea
- Bismarck Archipelago, a part of Papua New Guinea
- Bismarck Range, a mountain range in Papua New Guinea
- Collinsvale, Tasmania, originally named Bismarck, in Australia

=== Other places ===
- Cape Bismarck, NE Greenland
- Bismarck, Chihuahua, a village in Mexico
- Bismark, Germany, the town after which Otto von Bismarck's ancestors were named
- Bismark, Limpopo, a town in South Africa

== Military ==
=== Ships ===
- Bismarck-class battleship, a German class of ship
- Bismarck-class corvette, German class of six corvettes
- SMS Bismarck, a German Kreuzerfregatte decommissioned in 1891
- SS Bismarck, a German ocean liner, launched in 1914, later renamed RMS Majestic
- Bismarck, a 1939 German World War II battleship
- USNS City of Bismarck (T-EPF-9), a 2017 United States high speed troop transport

=== Battles ===
- Battle of Route Bismarck
- Battle of the Bismarck Sea

== Entertainment ==
- Bismarck (board game), a game from Avalon Hill about the hunt for the battleship Bismarck
- Computer Bismarck, a 1980 turn-based strategy video game by Strategic Simulations
- Bismarck (video game), a 1987 turn-based strategy video game by Personal Software Services
- "Bismarck", a 2019 song by Sabaton

=== Film and television ===
- Bismarck (1914 film), a 1914 German silent historical film
- Bismarck (1925 film), a 1925 German silent historical film
- Bismarck (1940 film), a 1940 film by Wolfgang Liebeneiner
- Sink the Bismarck!, a 1960 British film about the chase and sinking of the Bismarck.
- Bismark (TV series), a 1984 Japanese anime series created by Studio Pierrot

== Food ==
- Berliner (doughnut) or Bismarck
- Dutch baby pancake or Bismarck
- Black Velvet (beer cocktail) or Bismarck, a beer mix
- Bismarck herring or pickled herring
- Bismarck (apple), an apple cultivar

== People ==
- Bismarck (surname)
- Bismarck (given name)

== Other uses ==
- House of Bismarck, a German noble family descending from Herebord von Bismarck
- Bismarck Sapphire Necklace, saphire necklace by Cartier.
- Bismarck tower, type of german-polish monument.
- Bismarck Club, racially integrated semi-professional baseball team based in Bismarck, North Dakota, in the 1930s

== See also ==
- Bismarckia, a genus of palms
- Bismarck ringed python, species of snake.
- Bismack Biyombo, congolese basketball player
- Bismark Township, Nebraska (disambiguation)
- Fürst Bismarck, a list of ships
- Jan Eskymo Welzl or Arctic Bismarck (1868–1948), Czech traveller and adventurer
- Bismarck-Mandan Pards, former minor league baseball team.
- USS Bismarck Sea (CVE-95)
