= 15 cm SK C/28 =

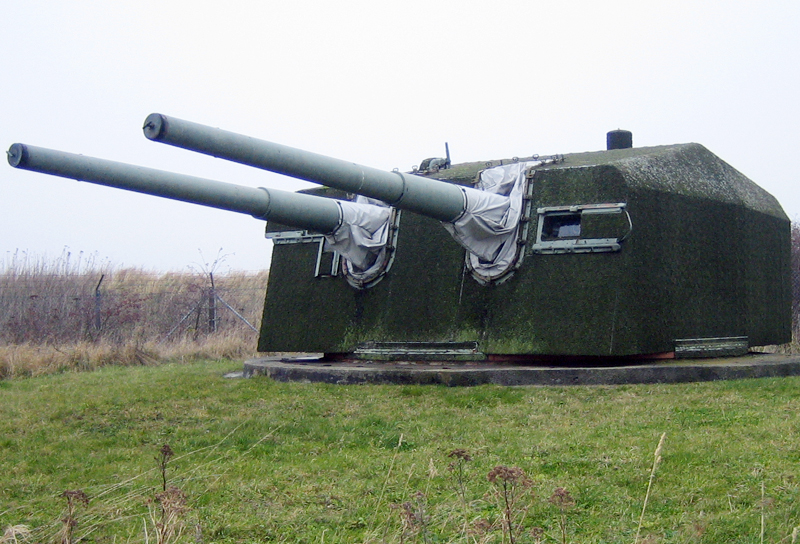
- 15 cm SK C/28 in Drh LC/34 turret from Gneisenau used as coast-defense guns in Denmark
- Type: Naval gun Coastline-defence gun
- Place of origin: Nazi Germany

Service history
- In service: 1935–2001
- Used by: Nazi Germany; Denmark
- Wars: Second World War

Production history
- Designer: Rheinmetall
- Designed: 1930—35
- Manufacturer: Rheinmetall
- Produced: 1935—43?

Specifications
- Mass: 9,026–9,080 kg (19,899–20,018 lb)
- Length: 8.291 metres (27 ft 2 in)
- Barrel length: 7.815 metres (25 ft 8 in)
- Shell: separate-loading, cased charge
- Caliber: 149.1 millimetres (5.87 in)
- Breech: semi-automatic, vertical sliding-block
- Elevation: depends on the mount
- Traverse: depends on the mount
- Rate of fire: 8 rpm (maximum)
- Muzzle velocity: 875 m/s (2,870 ft/s)
- Maximum firing range: 23,000 metres (25,000 yd) at 40°

The 15 cm SK C/28 (Note: SK - Schnelladekanone (quick loading cannon); C - Construktionsjahr (year of design)) was a German medium-caliber naval gun used during the Second World War. It served as the secondary armament for the Bismarck class and Scharnhorst-class battleships, Deutschland-class cruisers and the Graf Zeppelin-class aircraft carriers. A number of surplus weapons were used as coast-defense guns and eight were adapted to use Army carriages and used as heavy field guns as the 15 cm Schiffskanone C/28 in Mörserlafette.

== Description ==
This gun was designed as a smaller and lighter version of the 15 cm SK C/25 guns used as the main armament of the Königsberg- and Leipzig-class cruisers. It shared the earlier gun's design with a loose barrel, jacket and breech-piece with a vertical sliding breech block.

=== Naval mountings ===
The Drh. LC/34 twin-gun mount was the most common mount for the gun in the Kriegsmarine. It was used as the secondary armament of the Bismarck-class and Scharnhorst-class battleships and was planned to equip the proposed H-class battleships. The mount weighed between 114–120 tonnes (112–118 long tons; 126–132 short tons), depending on its armor thickness; the Scharnhorst's mounts had between 14–3 cm (5.5–1.2 in) of armor while the Bismarck's had 10–2 cm (3.94–0.79 in). Maximum elevation was 40°, giving a range of 23,000 metres (25,000 yd) and maximum depression was -10°, while maximum elevating speed was 8° per second. Each mount was designed for full 360° of traverse, but was limited to much less than that by the ship's superstructure. Speed in train was a maximum of 9° per second. The fastest firing cycle was 7.5 seconds, or 8 rounds per minute. Ammunition was supplied by twin hoists between the guns, at the rear of the mount. The M-class cruiser was intended to use a lighter version of this mount with thinner armor that only weighed approximately 102 tonnes (100 long tons; 112 short tons). This may have designated as the Drh. LC/40, but development ceased when the ships were canceled in 1939.

Scharnhorst and Gneisenau also carried four single MPL C/35 mounts that weighed 26.71 tonnes (26.29 long tons; 29.44 short tons) with armor between 6–2 cm (2.36–0.79 in) thick. Each mount could depress -10° and elevate to 35°; this gave a maximum range of 22,000 metres (24,000 yd). The MPL C/28 mount used in the Deutschland-class cruisers was virtually identical to the newer mount except its gun shield was smaller so it weighed only 24.83 tonnes (24.44 long tons; 27.37 short tons).

The Graf Zeppelin-class aircraft carriers were going to carry eight twin-gun Dopp MPL C/36 casemate mountings. These weighed 47.6 tonnes (46.8 long tons; 52.5 short tons) and had an armored shield 30 millimetres (1.2 in) thick. The mount elevated at a speed of 6° per second and trained at a rate of 8° per second.

=== Coast defense mountings ===
The Küsten-Marinepivotlafette (Küst. MPL C/36) was a highly successful mobile coast defense mount fitted with a gun shield. The gun traversed on a six-legged firing platform that allowed 360° of traverse. It could depress -7° and elevate to a maximum of 47° 30', which gave it a range of 23,500 metres (25,700 yd). The gun on its carriage weighed 19,761 kilograms (43,566 lb). It was towed via two two-axle trailers, one at each end. For travel the four lateral legs of the platform folded vertically. It entered service in 1940.

=== Army mount ===
Production of carriages for the 21 cm Mörser 18 and the 17 cm Kanone 18 in Mörserlafette exceeded the available number of barrels in 1941 and eight SK C/28 barrels were adapted for use on the carriages as the 15 cm Schiffskanone C/28 in Mörserlafette. They were converted to Heer-standard percussion firing. Most guns were replaced by 17-centimetre (6.7 in) barrels as they became available, but one battery retained them through the beginning of the Battle of Kursk in July 1943.

=== Ammunition ===
The SK C/28 used several different shells depending on its target. The 15 cm Sprgr L/4.6 KZ m Hb weighed 45.5 kg (100 lb) and had a muzzle velocity of 785 m/s (2,580 ft/s). It was a nose-fused HE shell with ballistic cap with two copper driving band and a lead ring behind them to act as a decoppering device by scraping away any copper residue from the driving band. The 15 cm Sprgr L/4.5 Bd Z m. Hb was a base-fused shell with a ballistic cap and weighed 44.8 kg (99 lb). It was roughly equivalent to the British "Common Pointed" and also used a lead decoppering ring. The armor-piercing 15 cm Pzgr L/3.8 m Hb shell had a ballistic cap and weighed 45.3 kg (100 lb). All shells used 14.1 kg (31 lb) of propellant in an artificial silk bag, housed in a brass cartridge case. An illumination shell was also available, although details are unknown.

== History ==
Surplus naval mountings were used to reinforce German coast defenses from Norway to the French Atlantic coast. These included guns from incomplete or disarmed ships like the aircraft carrier Graf Zeppelin or the battleship Gneisenau. For example, three or four of the Graf Zeppelin's Dopp MPL C/36 mounts equipped both batteries of Naval Artillery Battalion (Marine-Artillerie-Abteilung) 517 at Cap Romanov near Petsamo, Finland while two of the Gneisenau's Drh. LC/34 mounts were emplaced on the west coast of Denmark at Esbjerg where they equipped Batterie Gneisenau of Naval Artillery Battalion 518. All told, a total of 111 SK C/28 guns were employed on coast defense duties in a variety of mounts, 28 in Norway, 12 in Denmark, 24 in the German Bight, 8 in the Netherlands, and 39 in Belgium and the Atlantic coast of France.

Surviving guns in Norway and Denmark were used throughout the Cold War by both countries.

== See also ==
- List of naval guns

=== Weapons of comparable role, performance and era ===
- BL 6 inch Mk XXIII naval gun: approximate British equivalent
- 6"/47 caliber Mark 16 gun: approximate US equivalent
