= Girlfriends, Ghosts, and Other Stories =

2016 short story collection by Robert Walser

- Author: Robert Walser
- Translator: Tom Whalen; Nicole Kongeter; Annette Wiesner
- Language: English
- Publisher: New York Review Books
- Publication date: 2016
- Publication place: United States
- Media type: Print
- Pages: 200
- ISBN: 978-1-68137-016-3

Girlfriends, Ghosts, and Other Stories is a 2016 English-language short story collection of 88 works by the Swiss author Robert Walser, including feuilletons, short stories, and prose pieces. The works are translated by Tom Whalen with Nicole Kongeter and Annette Wiesner. The book is published by New York Review Books.

== Background ==
The included works range from the years 1907 to 1933. In 1929, Walser entered a Bern psychiatric clinic, Waldau, after episodes of anxiety and depression. In 1933, when he was transferred against his will to a different location in Herisau, he apparently abandoned writing.

All but three of the included works come from Sämtliche Werke in Einzelausg, the 21-volume 1985 German collection of Walser's work. "The Belletristic Book" comes from volume five of the pencil zone archives. "The Tip" and "The Carousel" are taken from Feuer (2003), a collection of prose pieces and poems that had never appeared in book form.

== Style and themes ==
Tom Whalen notes in the afterword that Walser "wrote like someone upon whom nothing is lost" and matched his sentence-construction to thought. Tristan Burke describes the categories of most of the pieces as: "depictions of nature, landscape or place, usually prompted by the narrator’s experience on a walk, portraits of people, games with language [...], and responses to other books." Burke wrote that the "modernist sophistication" in the works often takes the form of the "cryptic, aphoristic sentences that demand time and thought to be comprehended."

A.M. Kaempf at The Los Angeles Review of Books wrote that the style is playful and irreverent, and that Walser is "present in his prose as most authors are not, living between the lines, strolling alongside his sentences as if he might add a few more words at any moment."

=== Format and genre ===
Most of the included works are in Walser's usual form of the feuilleton. Tristan Burke labelled the works as récits or as unclassifiable. Other reviewers have similarly said that the writings evade comparison and categorization. (Also see: Main article section Robert Walser: Format and genre.) Tom Whalen states in the afterword:

For the feuilletonist anything can be an occasion for a prose piece: a walk in the mountains, a new hairstyle, an old fountain, shopwindows, a kitten, a carousel, a Parisian newspaper, an hour of the day. It is, however, the rare feuilletonist, no matter how fine a quick-sketch artist, who can bestow permanence to reality’s ephemera.

— Tom Whalen - Afterword to Girlfriends, Ghosts, and Other Stories (2016)

== Reception ==
Benjamin Woodard at Electric Lit wrote in a review that the "very strong [...] mishmash of stories, essays, reviews, and remarks delightfully captures Walser’s playful use of language." Woodard noted several darker stories where Walser's narrator "takes the role of commoner absorbing the actions of a drastically changing world, where friendly faces can hide danger and power is fleeting", including a 1917 piece that indirectly comments on World War I. Woodard adds that the nature stories contain a sense of "wonder and sanctuary for the writer."

Tristan Burke at Minor Literature wrote that everything in the collection "feels like spring" and that Walser shows the "beauty of the quotidian" even in the later pieces where he becomes darker and anxious. Burke quotes W.G. Sebald, who said about Walser, "he illumined every page with the most genial light." Similarly A.M. Kaempf at the Los Angeles Review of Books wrote, "there is something enchanted about the way he sees the world — a deliberate innocence that leads him to be satirical but not cynical, melancholy but not miserable, lonely but not forlorn. [...] Pieces in this [...] volume span 26 years, but from beginning to end Walser retains a youthful exuberance."

Jeffrey Gleaves at The Paris Review wrote in a review that the sketches are labelled short fiction but "read like flash essays, or brief, beautifully composed diary entries." He noted that Walser "gleefully injects novella-sized plots into two-page character sketches."

Kirkus Reviews wrote that the "miscellany" suggested by the title "delivers." The reviewer noted that contemporaries thought Kafka was inspired by Walser as a kindred spirit, but stated Walser's work is "lighter, [...] more playful, and very attuned to detail." The reviewer also said that the pieces are about "looking closely and paying attention" on many varied subjects and situations.

== Pieces included ==
- "A Morning" (Note: In Benjamin Woodard's summary, "[it] recounts the tedium and minutiae of office work, speaks to [Walser's] love of nature, toys with the confines of a traditional job, describes a harried worker as 'Totally Be-Mondayed' and his environment "a life among desks." Characters battle over an opened window, a woman outside sings, and [...] Mother Nature [outside] makes the morning hours drag for the men stuck indoors.")
- "She Writes" (Note: A seemingly angry letter written by a woman who worked as nude model for a painter and is demanding payment, among other discussions. The piece begins, "Hey, old monster. Tell me, where the hell are you? [...] You seem to be hiding, pretending not to be at home.")
- "An ABC in Pictures by Max Liebermann" (Note: Discusses an illustrated book of the alphabet by artist Max Liebermann) (1909)
- "Sketch (I)" (Note: Seemingly a parody of romance novel.)
- "Poetry (I)"
- "The Forest"
- "Lunch Break" (Note: The full text has been posted online by The New York Review.) (1914)
- "The Kitten (I)"
- "A Little Ramble"
- "The Hand Harp" (Note: A short discussion of the music and particular instrument played by "farmhands or lads" often in front of the houses "where their young maidens dwell.")
- "The Goddess" (Note: The narrator describes a goddess who descends onto the road on a cloud that resembles a swan. All the nearby people see her. The cloud departs and the sight vanishes, and people go into cafes to tell of the event.)
- "The Look"
- "The Morning"
- "Autumn Afternoon"
- "The Man"
- "The Grave of the Mother"
- "Remember This" (Note: Seemingly a poetic reminiscence of the sublime. It includes advice about, "If indifference and unkindness take hold of your being, stir your memory and [...]". The full text has been posted online by The New York Review. (1914))
- "On the Terrace" (Note: Woodard writes that this piece "vividly describes a rain shower’s effect on a lake")
- "The Little Sheep"
- "Spring" (Note: The narrator observes a bird "trying to practice its singing, endeavoring to loosen its throat")
- "A Little Expedition"
- "Ash, Needle, Pencil, and Match" (Note: The narrator writes short essays that "bring to light a variety of curiosities" on the 4 seemingly uninteresting items in the title. He notes at the beginning, about these items: "it's possible to say something meaningful [...] only by deeper penetration." The full text has been posted online by The New York Review.)
- "The Young Traveling Salesman" (Note: The narrator recalls a pulp magazine story he read as a boy.)
- "Toothache"
- "The Nimble and the Lazy"
- "No One" (Note: A fairy tale)
- "The Murderess" (Note: The narrator is informed that a random passerby previously killed her husband, and notes her appearance is like "any upright, honest, diligent woman.")
- "Lake Piece"
- "Schwendimann" (Note: A man named Schwendimann restlessly visits various locations including a pawnship, butcher, courthouse, poorhouse, and firehouse, etc, but dully finds at each place his own indecisiveness and lack of purpose. He eventually finds peace at the "house that everyone finds in the end", which has a skeleton at the door.)
- "The Forsaken One"
- "Dear Little Swallow" (Note: The narrator writes a letter to the bird. The first lines are, "I saw you early today from the window and now I'm writing to you, which perhaps is pointless, since it's unlikely the letter will reach you, and in any case you're unacquainted with reading. Also you're not in the address book, but surely you live enchantingly in your hidden nest where you sleep and dream. Apropos: You always find enough food, don't you?")
- "The Children’s Game" (Note: Seemingly a commentary on World War I, in which children play a game of pointless cyclical domination.) (1919)
- "The Philosopher"
- "Page from a Diary (I)"
- "Tram Ride"
- "The Kitten (II)"
- "Latest News" (1921)
- "News Number Two" (1921)
- "News Three" (Note: The narrator discusses various audience members ("some of whom had over-imbibed") and performers who he observed at a burlesque theater. The narrator then changes subjects to details he perceived on a recent trip to Thun, Wichtrach, the Bernese Oberland, Heimberg, and to the small island house where Kleist once lived.) (1921)
- "Fourth News" (Note: The narrator discusses several random details, then focuses on the subject of a "NEWSPAPER." He describes comically extreme indecisiveness about the issue of picking up and reading a nearby newspaper, or not.) (1921)
- "Congratulations on the Twenty-Fifth Anniversary of the Journal Die Schweiz"
- "How Are You?" (Note: A discussion of the title expression, which begins "Isn't it quite irrelevant how we answer such a question?" The narrator also says, "To confess with a quip on your lips that you've gone to the dogs doesn't cause any harm." He observes that expressing discontent attests to discomfort.)
- "Afternoon Tea"
- "The Girls" (1924)
- "Overcoats"
- "Shadow"
- "The Lover and the Unknown Girl"
- "The Tip" (Note: The first lines are, "What did I do recently? Am I still worthy of writing a prose piece? Will anyone ever again consider me a poet? I doubt it, because I accepted a tip. Do authors accept delivery fees? Let me explain.")
- "The Keller Novella" (Note: The narrator discusses Gottfried Keller's A Village Romeo and Juliet.)
- "Walser on Walser" (Note: According to Simon Wortham, "the writer addresses himself but then views the results as if contemplating a letter that is addressed to him. Such letters may be sent (as presumably they often were), he concludes, by concerned parties worrying over his literary future.")
- "Sacher-Masoch" (Note: About Leopold von Sacher-Masoch)
- "Shop Windows (I)"
- "Gretchen"
- "Porcelain" (Note: A short drama script. The characters and venue are specified as porcelein figurines in a display window of a trinket shop.)
- "Ludwig" (Note: Marked as "A Review" in the first line. The narrator comments on the characters Ludwig, "Mr. Batschano", and an "Edith." In the final lines of the piece, the narrator seemingly quotes a line from the reviewed book, but then says: "That's not in the book; it's penned by me. What a curious source I'm drawing from here.") (1925)
- "It’s All Right, Miss" (Note: In this short piece, the narrator hears a man say the title phrase to a woman who had a "mishap" in a restaurant. The narrator muses on how the words are polite but discourteous, and how the man failed to give any real assistance.)
- "Essay on Bismarck"
- "Anecdote"
- "The Nobel Prize" (Note: The narrator tells of being fooled by a false notice in the newspaper about the winner of the Nobel Prize. The narrator uses placeholder or allegorical names and says that "Hopeful" (who he also calls "High-hope") did not win the prize, instead "Persistence" did. The narration includes the lines, "Yesterday I was like a snapped-off plant, while today I'm a sturdy tree. What illusions can do to us! Brain power, you're weird!" A full text is posted online by Suhrkamp Verlag.) (1926)
- "The Carousel"
- "'Underappreciated Poets Among Us?'—Answer to a Survey" (Note: According to Simon Wortham, the piece "reflects ironically on the supposedly luxurious, gentlemanly life of the struggling writer and the fashionable benefits assumed to accompany cultish underappreciation.")
- "Discussion" (Note: Among other things, the narration touches on Marcel Proust, Romain Rolland, the "Augsburger Abendblatter," Heinrich Heine, someone's unfunny essay on the subject of "divine Italian laughter", the Fuggerhäuser in Augsburg, the Berlin Secession, Walther Rathenau's high opinion of Hermann Hesse's Peter Camenzind (1904), Tolstoy's supposedly anecdotal early attack on Shakespeare, a hurdy-gurdy player, a comedian, Haydn's The Seasons, and says he has read Anatole France.)
- "Girlfriends"
- "The Young Woman in the Country House"
- "The Bob" (Note: About the bob haircut. Benjamin Woodard writes that this piece and "The Girls" are "perhaps unintentional slips into sexism and degradation masked as good humor. The inclusion of these works may temper the attraction of Walser to some.")
- "The Red Leather Pouch" (Note: A spy story) (1927)
- "Detective Novel" (1927)
- "Poet Story" (Note: The narration includes, "I'm not mocking the poet who each evening, to put it bluntly, ate cheese, and at midday, if you like, ingested soup, and led a solid life. Derision, in this instance, is the farthest thing from my mind.")
- "The Belletristic Book"
- "Garden Arbor Essay" (Note: The narrator says he alludes to novels published in the early editions of The Garden Arbor, and writes, "Do I adore The Garden Arbor? Yes, I believe I do." The magazine was the first successful mass-circulation German newspaper and a forerunner of modern magazines.)
- "Ghosts" (1928-1929)
- "Female Portrait"
- "A Man of the World"
- "Something About Writing"
- "Tolstoy and Hutten" (Note: The narrator explains that a Tolstoy character reminds him of Ulrich von Hutten and Ufenau.)
- "The Woman Novelist"
- "The Equestrienne" (Note: The narrator describes images from a woman's normal life before becoming a horse-rider, then transitions from her spiritual desires to the poetic symbiosis he sees between the horse and the rider.)
- "She Bettered Herself"
- "A Woman’s Book" (Note: The narrator says he is unable to absorb Balzac's Peau de chagrin in German translation, then muses on various other impressions of storytelling, tropes, and a specific unnamed book. He observes that, "Famous authors can have a sobering effect, whereas a total unknown can invigorate us.") (1931)
- "The Coffeehouse" (Note: A description of sensory impressions and musings about a coffee shop, including patrons and their psychology, hat styles, servers, sounds, idleness, and the supposed balance of economic class in the coffeeshop. The narrator notes: "From time to time, the gérant, or manager, dropped in, as if it were becoming to quickly and nonchalantly examine the day's business." A full text version is posted online by NYRB.) (1931)
- "Literary Switzerland" (Note: A sociological historical fiction sketch. The first line is, "Once the Romans roamed through Switzerland disseminating culture. There might already have been settlements of significance that preceded them." The narrator briefly discusses figures (Jean-Jacques Rousseau, Gottfried Keller, Meyer, Gotthelf) and societal changes in literary history.)
- "Embonpoint"
- "The Bourgeois"
- "The Pipsqueak" (Note: The narrator says that the person referred to by the title has supposedly written "close to a hundred short novels, which, no matter how harshly you criticize them from a literary standpoint, forced their way into the public.")
- "Portrait of a Lady"
- "The Precious One" (Note: Describes a person "trying his best to believe himself happy." The narrator says the person will be so carefully handled in the piece that "the likeness I'm attempting resembles a breeze or fragrance." The person's childhood has idyllic surroundings, but "even as a child a special quality veiled him." The final line is, "He was gripped by an illness he could not resist, and leaving memories behind, let it lead him away.") (1932-1933)
- "Something About Eating" (Note: The year of this work, 1932-1933, was around the time that Walser was transferred against his will to a different sanatorium and abandoned writing. Among other comments, the narrator says that "Every sensible person sincerely praises a bowl of soup" and "Meals are eaten either at home or in a restaurant, bringing differences to light that aren't necessarily significant.") (1932-1933)
- "Mother Nature" (Note: The narrator discusses volcanos, earthquakes, floods, hurricanes, and also "an iceberg, which the captain has the task of carefully evading," etc. The opening line is, "Nature isn't always good; no, often she's enraged, and each time there are valid scientific reasons for this.") (1933)
