= Geschützwagen Tiger =

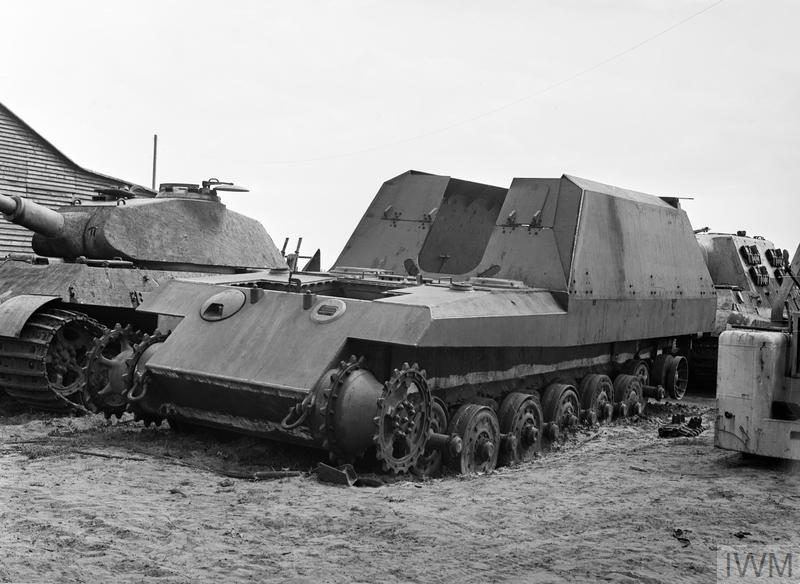
- Abandoned prototype chassis of the Geschützwagen Tiger für 17cm K72 (Sf) with an abandoned Tiger II beside the tank and a Jagdtiger behind.
- Type: Self-propelled artillery
- Place of origin: Germany

Production history
- Manufacturer: Krupp
- No. built: 1 partial prototype

Specifications
- Mass: 58 tonnes (64 short tons; 57 long tons)
- Length: 13.00 m (42 ft 8 in)
- Width: 3.27 m (10 ft 9 in)
- Height: 3.15 m (10 ft 4 in)
- Crew: 7
- Armor: 16–30 millimetres (0.63–1.18 in)
- Main armament: 170mm K 72 L/50, 210mm Mortar 18/1 L/31, 305mm GrW L/16 mortar, or 420mm Grw mortar
- Secondary armament: 2 x 7.92mm machine guns
- Engine: Maybach HL230P30; 700 hp
- Transmission: 8 forward, 4 reverse
- Suspension: torsion bar
- Operational range: 200 km (120 mi) on road
- Maximum speed: 35 km/h (22 mph)

The Geschützwagen Tiger (G.W. Tiger) was a German self-propelled gun carrier of World War II that never saw service.

It would have been able to carry either the 17cm Kanone K72 (Sf) or the short barrelled 21cm Mörser 18/1 which had the same mounting; with the former it would be known as Grille 17, the latter Grille 21.

== History ==
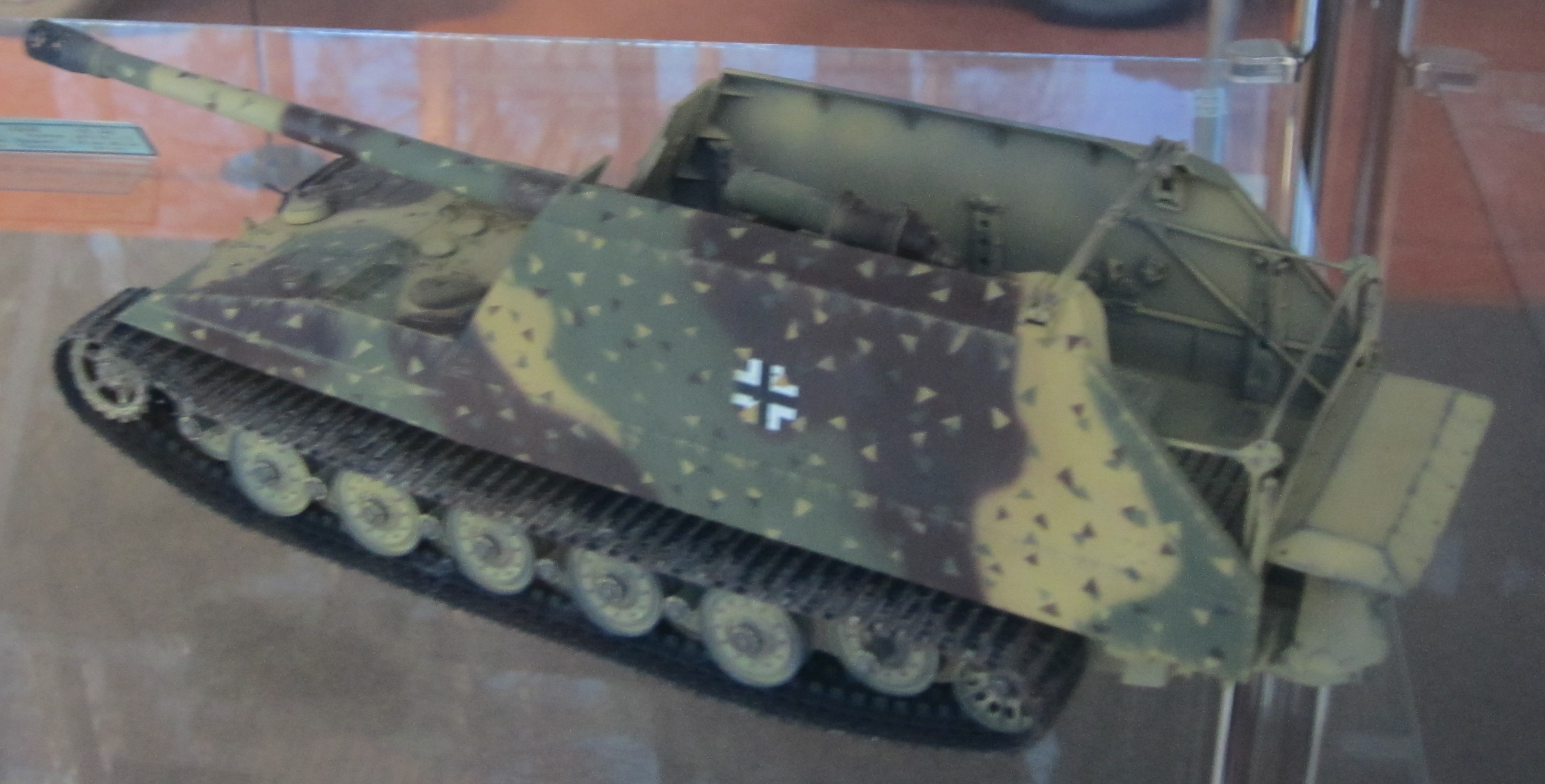
A model of Geschutzwagen Tiger

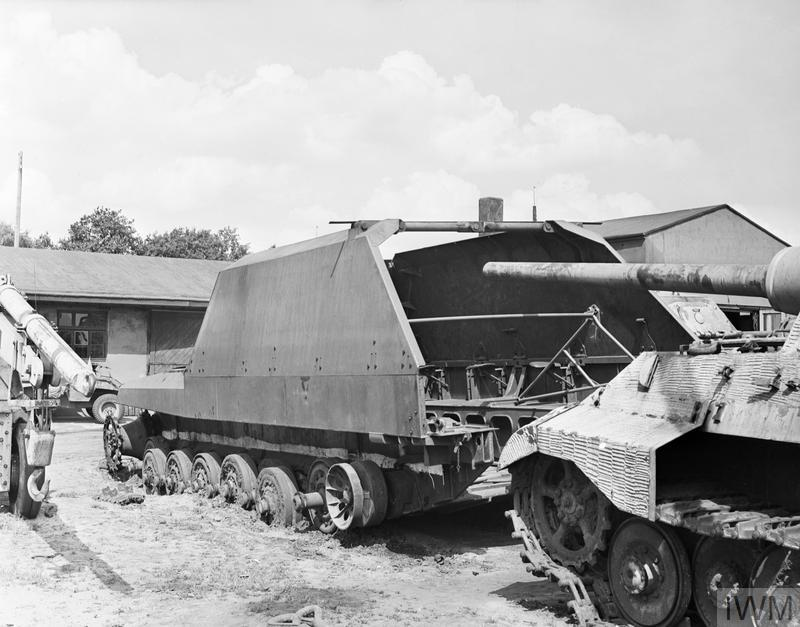
G.W. Tiger rear

The decision to build this heavy artillery based on an extended chassis of the Tiger II came in June 1942. The first prototype was tested at the end of the war. However, due to Germany being on the brink of surrender, the vehicle never saw service, and was captured by the Allies. While several armaments were considered, the most practical guns mounted were the 17 cm Kanone 18, or the 21 cm Mörser 18.

As early as June 1942, it was decided to design self-propelled mounts for the heavier type of artillery so that the latter could be brought into action as quickly as possible, avoiding the break-down into small loads that transport by normal tractors entailed. In January 1943, such a carriage, based on the proposed Tiger Ausf B was ordered. Initially, the 360° traverse was to be achieved by putting the complete vehicle on a turntable, but eventually, it was decided to simplify the design by making provision for winching the weapon off the rear of the carriage onto a 360° traverse platform carried on the back. The first prototype was at Sennelager for testing at the end of the war. Concern at the length of time needed to produce conventional heavy artillery led to an order in January 1945 for the production of heavy, smooth-bore mortars, capable of firing fin-stabilized projectiles over long ranges. Krupp and Škoda competed for the design, and Škoda produced a 30.5cm Gr. W. (Granat Werfer - mortar) prototype by the beginning of April 1945. A 42cm Gr. W. project was also underway. These mortars automatically returned to a 40° elevation for loading, the Grille, mounting this weapon, was to have four hydraulic jacks for stability when firing.
