= 15 cm Schnelladekanone C/28 in Mörserlafette =

German heavy gun used in the Second World War

15 cm SchiffsKanone C/28 in Mörserlafette
- Type: Heavy gun
- Place of origin: Nazi Germany

Service history
- Used by: Nazi Germany
- Wars: World War II

Production history
- Designer: Rheinmetall
- Manufacturer: Rheinmetall
- Produced: 1941
- No. built: 8

Specifications
- Mass: 16,870 kilograms (37,190 lb)
- Barrel length: 8.195 metres (322.6 in) L/55
- Shell: separate-loading, cased charge
- Caliber: 149.1 millimetres (5.87 in)
- Breech: horizontal sliding block
- Recoil: dual-recoil hydropneumatic
- Carriage: box trail
- Elevation: 0° to +50°
- Traverse: 16° on carriage 360° on platform
- Rate of fire: 2 rpm
- Muzzle velocity: 890 metres per second (2,900 ft/s)
- Maximum firing range: 23.7 kilometres (14.7 mi)

The 15 cm SchiffsKanone C/28 in Mörserlafette (SK C/28 in Mrs Laf) was a German heavy gun used in the Second World War.

== Development ==
Production of carriages for the 21 cm Mörser 18 and the 17 cm Kanone 18 in Mörserlafette exceeded available barrels in 1941 and eight naval 15 cm SK C/28 coast defense gun barrels were adapted for use on the carriages. They were converted to Heer-standard percussion firing (see the articles of those guns for details on the design of the carriage).

== Operational use ==
For Operation Barbarossa (the invasion of the Soviet Union), it equipped Artillerie-Abteilung 625. Most guns were replaced by 17 cm barrels as they became available. However, for Case Blue (the German summer offensive in southern Russia), one battery of Artillery Battalion (Artillerie-Abteilung) 767 was still equipped with them. That same battery retained them through the beginning of the Battle of Kursk in July 1943.

== Ammunition ==
The 15 cm SK C/28 in Mrs Laf could not be converted to use the Heer's standard 15 cm ammunition and had to use naval ammunition. These included the 15 cm Sprgr L/4.6 KZ m. Hb., the 15cm Sprgr L/4.5 BdZ m. Hb. and the 15 cm Pzgr L/3.8 m. Hb. The former was a nose-fuzed 45.5 kilograms (100 lb) HE shell with a ballistic cap. The second was a base-fuzed 44.8 kilograms (99 lb) HE shell, also with a ballistic cap. The last-named was a standard 45.3 kilograms (100 lb) armor-piercing shell. Only one 14.1 kilograms (31 lb) bag of propellant was used in a separate-loading cartridge case.
