= Fürst Bismarck =

Fürst Bismarck (Prince Bismarck) may refer to:

- SMS Fürst Bismarck, German armored cruiser of World War One
- SMS Fürst Bismarck (1915), German battlecruiser of the planned Mackensen class, canceled before completion
- SS Fürst Bismarck (1890), German ocean liner, Hamburg-America Line (HAPAG)
- SS Fürst Bismarck (1905), German ocean liner, Hamburg-America Line (HAPAG)
- Fürst Bismarck, a brand of the German liquor Kornbrand

== See also ==
- Otto von Bismarck (1815–1898), Prussian statesman who dominated German and European affairs
- Bismarck (disambiguation)
