= Bismarck (given name) =

The given name Bismarck or Bismark is shared by:

- Bismarck Barreto Faria (born 1969), Brazilian football player
- Bismarck Vinicyus Freire do Nascimento (1990–2026), Brazilian football player
- Bismarck du Plessis (born 1984), South African former rugby player
- Bismark Charles (born 2001), Ghanaian footballer
- Bismarck Kuyon (born 1939), Liberian politician
- Bismarck Myrick (born 1940), American diplomat
- Bismarck Veliz (born 1993), Nicaraguan footballer
- Bismark Adjei-Boateng (born 1994), Ghanaian footballer
- Bismark Ekye (born 1981), Ghanaian footballer
- Bismark Ferreira (born 1993), Brazilian footballer
- Bismark Idan (born 1989), Ghanaian footballer
- Bismark Ngissah (born 1998), Ghanaian footballer
