= Bismarck Township =

Bismarck Township may refer to:

- Bismarck Township, Michigan
- Bismarck Township, Sibley County, Minnesota

== See also ==
- Bismark Township, Nebraska (disambiguation)
