= Bismark Township, Nebraska =

Bismark Township, Nebraska may refer to the following places in Nebraska, United States:

- Bismark Township, Cuming County, Nebraska
- Bismark Township, Platte County, Nebraska

== See also ==
- Bismarck Township (disambiguation)
- Bismarck, Nebraska, an unincorporated community in Cuming County, Nebraska
