= Bismark Ekye =

Ghanaian football defender

Personal information
- Full name: Bismark Ekye
- Date of birth: 13 January 1981 (age 45)
- Place of birth: Accra, Ghana
- Height: 1.85 m (6 ft 1 in)
- Position: Midfielder

Team information
- Current team: Borgotaro Calcio

Youth career
- 1998–1999: Okwawu United

Senior career*
| Years | Team | Apps | (Gls) |
| 1999–2000 | A.C. Pistoiese | 16 | (0) |
| 2000–2002 | Aglianese Calcio 1923 | 47 | (10) |
| 2002–2003 | ACF Fiorentina | 22 | (1) |
| 2004 | Ravenna Calcio | 11 | (1) |
| 2004–2005 | FC Vaduz | 5 | (1) |
| 2005–2006 | ASD Fortis Juventus | | |
| 2006–2007 | AS Trivento | | |
| 2007–2008 | AC Lunigiana | | |
| 2008– | Borgotaro Calcio | | |

International career
| 2004 | Ghana | 1 | (0) |
- * Club domestic league appearances and goals as of 1 February 2007

Bismark Ekye (born 13 January 1981 in Accra) is a Ghanaian football defender currently playing for Borgotaro Calcio of Italy.

== International ==
Ekye played his one and only game for the Black Stars on 16 June 2004 against South Africa.
