= Bismarck (surname) =

The surname Bismarck is most often associated with Otto von Bismarck (1815–1898), a Prussian statesman and first Chancellor of Germany.

Others with the name include:

- Carl-Eduard von Bismarck (born 1961), German politician and great-great-grandson of Otto von Bismarck
- Celia von Bismarck (1971–2010), Swiss humanitarian
- Debonnaire von Bismarck (born 1959), English businesswoman and socialite
- Ernst Ludwig Wilhelm von Bismarck (1772–1815), Prussian army officer during the Napoleonic Wars
- Gottfried Graf von Bismarck-Schönhausen (1901–1949), Nazi parliamentary representative, grandson of Otto von Bismarck
- Gottfried von Bismarck (1962–2007), son of Prince Ferdinand von Bismarck, great-great-grandson of Otto von Bismarck
- Herbert von Bismarck (1849–1904), Secretary of State, son of Otto von Bismarck
- Julius von Bismarck (born 1983), German artist
- Mona von Bismarck (1897–1983), American socialite and fashion icon
- Nikolai von Bismarck (born 1986), British-German photographer
- Otto Christian Archibald von Bismarck (1897–1975), grandson of Chancellor Otto von Bismarck, politician and diplomat, Prince of Bismarck
- Philipp von Bismarck (1913–2006), German politician and farmer
