= Bismark, South Africa =

Bismark
- Location within Limpopo Location within South Africa
- Coordinates: 24.208°S 30.505°E
- Country: South Africa
- Province: Limpopo
- District: Mopani
- Municipality: Maruleng

Area
  - Total: 2.81 km^{2} (1.08 sq mi)

Population (2011)
  - Total: 2,705
  - Density: 963/km^{2} (2,490/sq mi)

Racial makeup (2011)
  - Black African: 99.8%
  - White: 0.1%
  - Other: 0.1%

First languages (2011)
  - Northern Sotho: 95.6%
  - Tsonga: 2.3%
  - Other: 2.1%
- Time zone: UTC+2 (SAST)

Bismark is a town in Mopani District Municipality in the Limpopo province of South Africa.
