= 21 cm Mörser 18 =

German heavy howitzer used in the Second World War

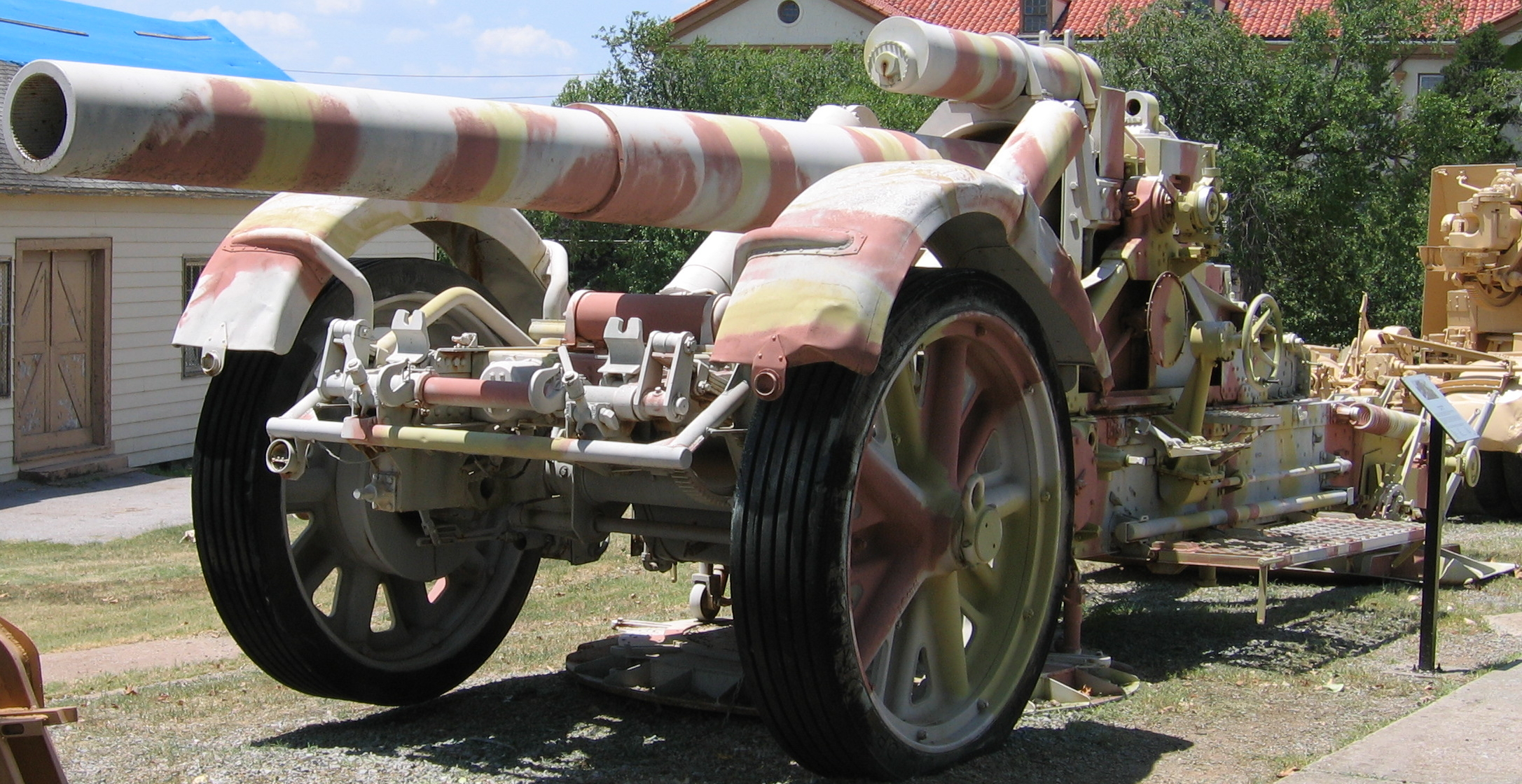
- Front of Morser 18 US Army field artillery museum at Fort Sill
- Type: Heavy howitzer
- Place of origin: Germany

Service history
- In service: 1939–45
- Used by: Nazi Germany
- Wars: World War II

Production history
- Designer: Krupp
- Designed: 1933
- Manufacturer: Krupp
- Produced: 1939–45
- No. built: 711+

Specifications
- Mass: 16,700 kg (36,817 lbs)
- Barrel length: 6.51 m (21 ft 4 in) L/30
- Shell: separate-loading cased ammunition (6 charges)
- Shell weight: 113 kg (249 lb) (HE)
- Caliber: 211 mm (8.3 in)
- Breech: horizontal sliding-block
- Recoil: dual-recoil hydro-pneumatic
- Carriage: box trail
- Elevation: -6° to +70°
- Traverse: 16° on wheels 360° on platform
- Muzzle velocity: 550–565 m/s (1,800–1,850 ft/s)
- Effective firing range: 16,725 m (18,291 yd)

The 21 cm Mörser 18 (21 cm Mrs 18), or 21 cm Mörser M 18/L31, was a German heavy howitzer used in the Second World War by Independent artillery battalions and batteries. A number were also used by coastal artillery units.

== Design ==
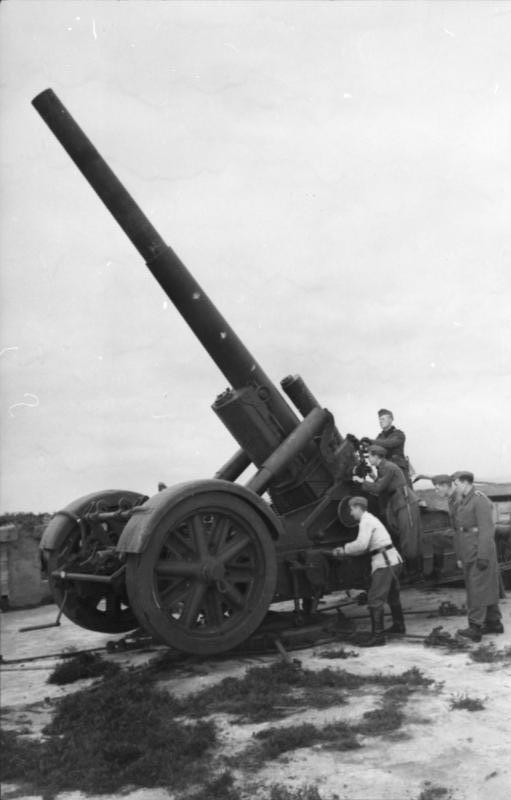
A Mrs 18 deployed in Norway.

The Mörser 18 was designed to replace the obsolescent World War I-era 21 cm Mörser 16. The gun design itself was not significantly different from its predecessor but the carriage was improved considerably. It was one of the first artillery pieces that incorporated a dual-recoil system. The barrel retracted naturally in its cradle, and the entire top carriage—which held the barrel and its cradle—retracted across the body of the carriage as well. This system damped out the recoil forces and made for a very steady firing platform. This carriage was also used for the 17 cm Kanone 18 in Mörserlafette and the 15 cm Schnelladekanone C/28 in Mörserlafette.

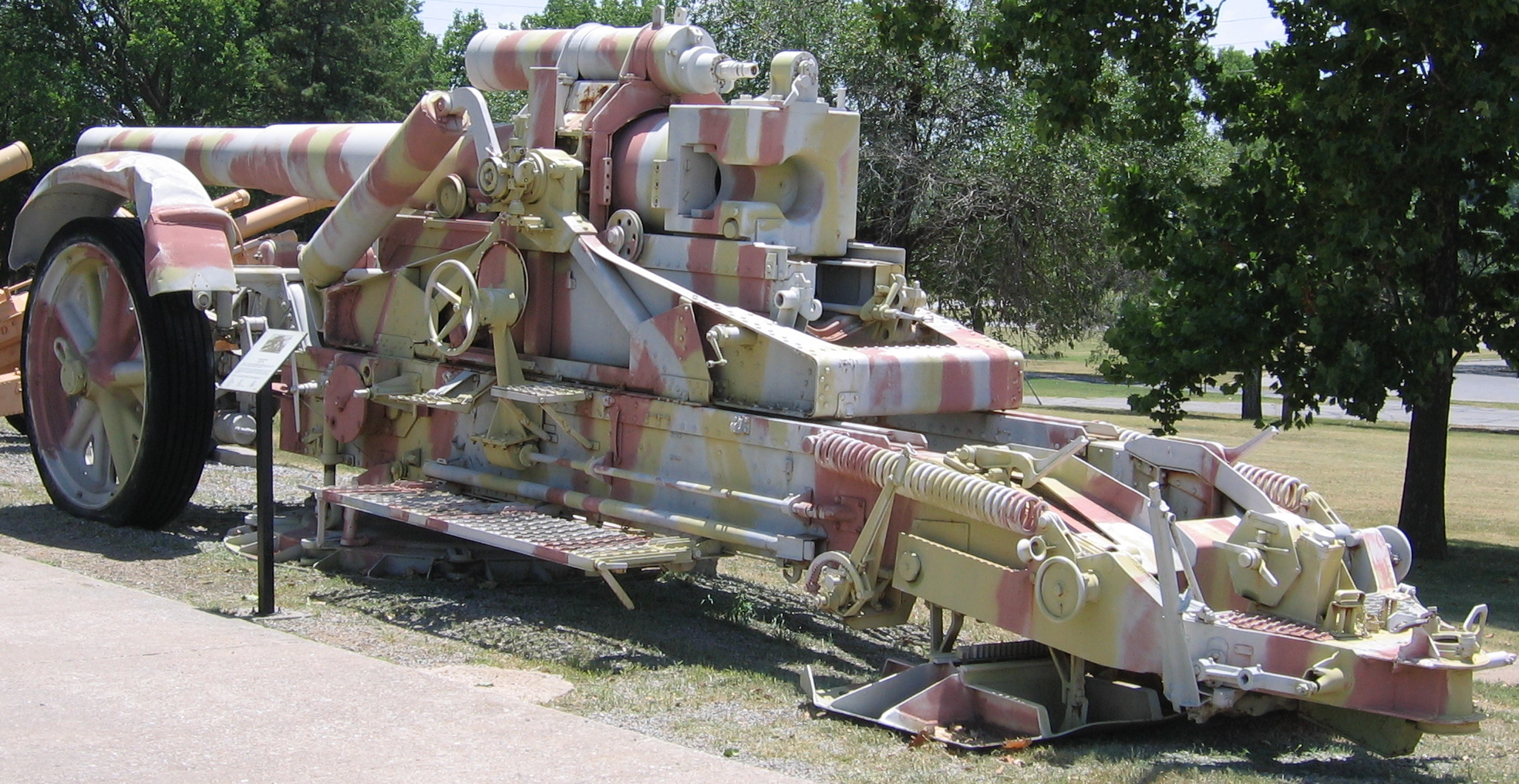
Rear of Morser 18 at Fort Sill artillery museum

The Mrs 18 was transported in two pieces, as was often the case for similarly sized weapons. For travel the barrel was slid on to a separate trailer. The carriage carried an integral firing platform that was lowered to the ground when emplacing the howitzer. The wheels were then cranked up off the ground and it was now ready for firing. A rear castor-wheel jack was used to raise the rear spade off the ground if the gun needed to be traversed more than the 16° allowed by the mount proper.

The Mrs 18 entered production at a low rate in 1939 shortly before the war began. The Germans cancelled production in 1942 in lieu of its smaller brother, the 17 cm Kanone 18 in Mörserlafette, which could fire almost twice as far, but resumed production in 1943.

Beginning in 1942, the 21 cm M 18 was one of a pair of weapons to have been mounted on production Geschützwagen Tiger self-propelled guns. A prototype was under test at the end of the war and was captured by American forces.
