= Escalation clause =

Clause in a contract adjusting costs to external factors

An escalation clause is a clause in a lease or contract that allows for a change in the agreed-upon price in response to a specific factor that is outside of the control of either party. This type of clause is used to protect against potential changes in the value of the goods or services being exchanged, such as in cases of inflation or other market fluctuations.

Escalation clauses are common in construction contracts. The clause may specify that the agreed-upon price for the project will be adjusted to reflect changes in the cost of raw materials, fuel, and labor during the course of the construction.

Escalation clauses may also be used in other types of contracts, such as leases for commercial or residential properties. In these cases, the clause may specify that the rent will be adjusted based on changes in the market value of the property, or on changes in the cost of utilities or other expenses.

When drafting a contract or lease that includes an escalation clause, it is important to carefully specify the factors that will trigger the adjustment, as well as the method for determining the new price. This will help to ensure that the clause is fair and reasonable for both parties, and that it is enforceable in the event of a dispute.

== See also ==
- Gold clause
