= 17 cm K (E) =

WW2 German railway gun

17 cm Kanone (E)
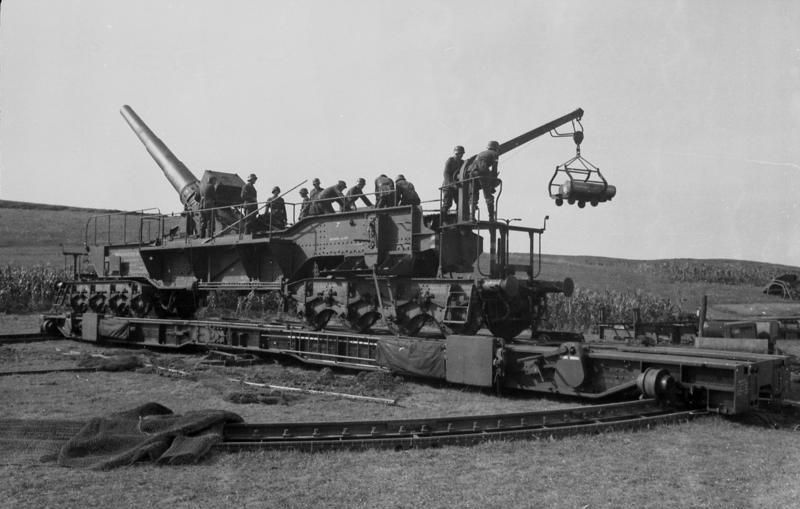
- Type: Railway Gun
- Place of origin: Germany

Service history
- Used by: Nazi Germany
- Wars: World War II

Production history
- Designer: Krupp
- Designed: 1937–38
- Manufacturer: Krupp
- Produced: 1938
- No. built: 6

Specifications
- Mass: 80,000 kg (180,000 lb)
- Barrel length: L/40
- Shell: separate-loading, cased charge
- Caliber: 172.6 millimetres (6.80 in)
- Breech: horizontal sliding-block
- Elevation: 10°–45°
- Traverse: 360°
- Muzzle velocity: 875 m/s (2,870 ft/s)
- Effective firing range: 13,350 m (14,600 yd)
- Maximum firing range: 27,200 m (29,700 yd)
- Filling weight: 6.4 kg (14 lb) of TNT

The 17 cm Kanone in Eisenbahnlafette (17 cm K (E)) was a German railroad gun used in the Second World War.

== Design & History ==
This weapon was designed with the intent of replacing the 15 cm K (E) mounted on the same carriage, although only 6 were built before it was realized that both guns were too small to justify railroad mounts. The gun was mounted on a simple pivot mount on a ballrace on a well-base flatcar with four outriggers. In action the outriggers and their jacks would be dropped to stabilize the gun and absorb the firing recoil. In addition jacks locked the spring suspension, bore on the surface of the rails and screw clamps gripped the rails for more stability. The elderly 17 cm Schnelladekanone L/40 was used because it was available in some numbers, having been designed as the casemate gun for the Deutschland-class predreadnought battleships. It fired a 17 cm Sprgr L/4.7 KZ mit Hb shell weighing 62.8 kilograms (138 lb). This was a standard HE shell with a nose fuze beneath a ballistic cap.

They spent the war assigned to Artillerie-Batteries 717 and 718 (E) along the Channel coast.
