= 17 cm Kanone 18 =

17 cm Kanone 18 in Mörserlafette
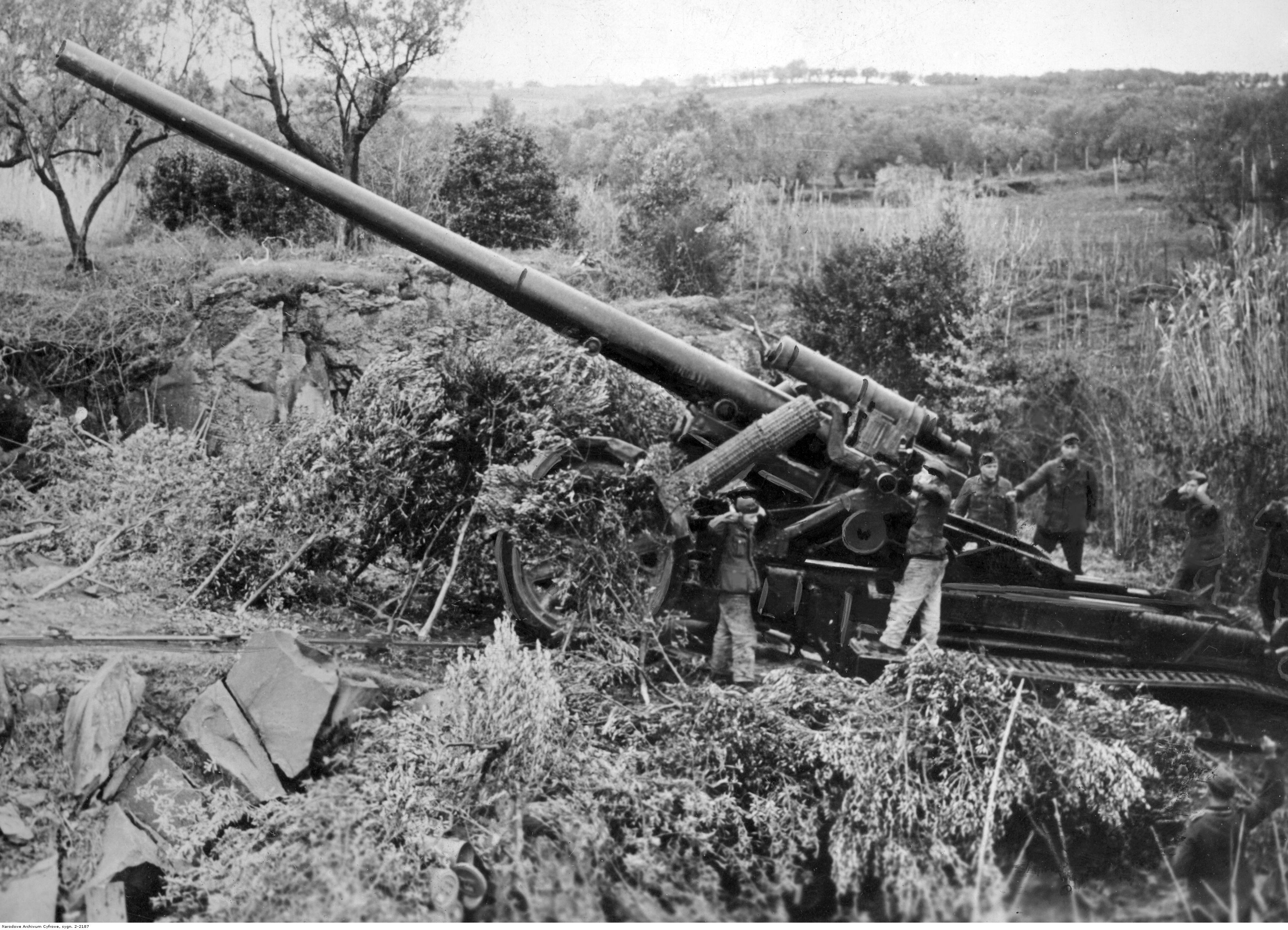
- 17 cm Kanone 18 in action during the Battle of Anzio
- Type: Heavy gun
- Place of origin: Germany

Service history
- In service: 1941–1945
- Used by: Germany
- Wars: World War II

Production history
- Designer: Krupp
- Manufacturer: Krupp (1941-1942), Hanomag (1943-1945)
- Produced: 1941–1945
- No. built: 338

Specifications
- Mass: For transport 23.375 t (23.006 long tons); In action 17.520 t (17.243 long tons)
- Barrel length: Bore 8.625 m (28 ft 3.6 in) L/50
- Crew: 10
- Shell: Separate-loading HE
- Shell weight: 62.8 kg (138 lb)
- Caliber: 172.5 mm (6.79 in)
- Breech: Horizontal-block
- Recoil: Dual-recoil hydro-pneumatic
- Carriage: Box trail
- Elevation: 0 to +50°
- Traverse: 16° on wheels 360° on platform
- Muzzle velocity: 925 m/s (3,030 ft/s)
- Maximum firing range: 29.6 km (18.4 mi)
- References: Bishop, Hogg, Ludeke & Zabecki.

The 17 cm Kanone 18 in Mörserlafette (English: 17 cm Cannon 18 on Mortar Carriage), abbreviated as 17 cm K 18 in MrsLaf, was a German heavy gun used during World War II.

== Design ==
The 17 cm K 18 in MrsLaf was a 172.5 mm (6.79 in) towed gun with a barrel 50 calibres long. The 17 cm K 18 in MrsLaf shared the same box trail carriage with the 21 cm Mörser 18. The carriage allowed transport of the weapon over short distances in one piece, whilst for longer distances the barrel was removed from the carriage and transported separately. A series of ramps and winches made removing the barrel a reasonably quick task for its time, but still required several hours. For all of the gun's bulk, a full 360-degree traverse could be achieved by two men.

=== Dual-recoil mechanism ===
A notable innovation by Krupp on the 21 cm Mörser 18 and the 17 cm Kanone 18 was the "double recoil" or dual-recoil carriage. The normal recoil forces were initially taken up by a conventional recoil mechanism close to the barrel, and then by a carriage sliding along rails set inside the travelling carriage. The dual-recoil mechanism absorbed all of the recoil energy with virtually no movement of the box trail upon firing, thus making for a very accurate weapon.

=== Ammunition ===
Projectiles

The 17 cm K 18 in MrsLaf fired three types of separately loaded ammunition.

Projectile	Fuse	Weight	Max range	Comments
17cm K Gr 39	AZ 35K or Dopp Z S/90K	68 kg (150 lb)	28 km (17 mi)	The standard HE shell with an explosive charge of 7.33 kg.
17cm K Gr 38 Hb	Hbgr Z 35K or Dopp Z S/90K	62.8 kg (138 lb)	29.6 km (18.4 mi)	Long-range shell fitted with a ballistic cap.
17cm Pzgr 43	Bd Z f 17cm Pzgr	71 kg (157 lb)	UNK	Armour-piercing shell with a velocity of 830 m/s (2,700 ft/s) and could penetrate 255 mm (10.0 in) of armour at 30° at 1,000 m (1,100 yd). It had an explosive charge of 2.34 kg.

Shell performance

The 17 cm K 18 in MrsLaf separately loaded ammunition used four charges. The gun's performance when firing the 62.8 kg (138 lb) 17cm K Gr 38 Hb long-range shell is depicted in the following table:

Charge	Muzzle velocity	Range
Charge 1	620 m/s (2,000 ft/s)	18.3 km (11.4 mi)
Charge 2	740 m/s (2,400 ft/s)	22.7 km (14.1 mi)
Charge 3	860 m/s (2,800 ft/s)	28 km (17 mi)
Charge 4	925 m/s (3,030 ft/s)	29.6 km (18.4 mi)

== History ==
In 1939, the 21 cm Mörser 18 began appearing in the Wehrmacht corps-level artillery regiments, replacing the obsolescent World War I-era 21 cm Mörser 16. The gun was able to send a 113 kg (249 lb) HE shell out to a range of 14.5 km (9 mi); however, by 1941, the Wehrmacht was seeking a longer-ranged weapon and Krupp responded by producing a smaller 172.5 mm (6.79 in) calibre increased-velocity weapon utilising the same carriage, with the designation Kanone 18.

The 17 cm K 18 in MrsLaf quickly impressed German artillery officers with its range, but the real surprise was the explosive power of the 62.8 kg (138 lb) shell, which was little different from the 113 kg (249 lb) shell of the 21 cm Mörser 18. Production commenced in 1941. In 1942, production of the 21 cm Mörser 18 was halted for almost two years so as to allow maximum production of the Kanone 18.

It has been suggested that the gun is the basis for the North Korean M-1978 Koksan but there is no particular evidence for this beyond the calibre.

== Operational history ==
The 17 cm K 18 in MrsLaf was employed at the corps and army echelons in order to provide long-range counter-battery support, as well as filling the same basic heavy support role as the 21 cm Mörser 18, the pair becoming the most common weapons used by the Wehrmacht in this role. In 1944, some Allied batteries used captured 17 cm K 18 in MrsLafs when ammunition supplies for their usual guns were disrupted by the long logistical chain from Normandy to the German border.

The 17 cm K 18 in MrsLaf was considered a technically excellent long range artillery piece for the German Army, with excellent range and a very effective shell. The gun's greatest weaknesses were that it was expensive to build and required careful maintenance. Additionally, it was quite slow to bring in and out of action, fairly difficult to maneuver and very slow to move off-road. Many were lost when their crews abandoned them when fleeing advancing Allied forces.

== Gallery ==
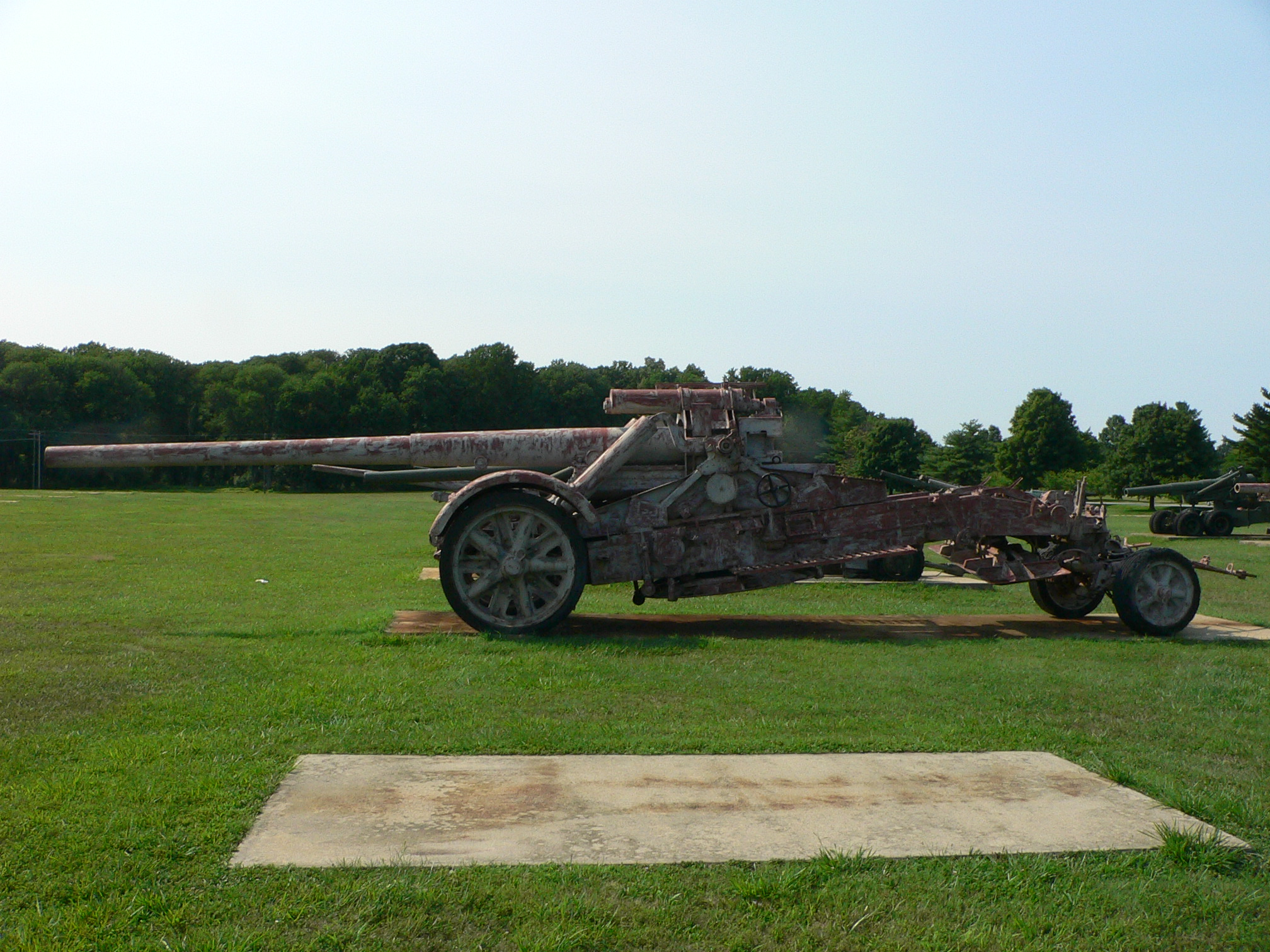

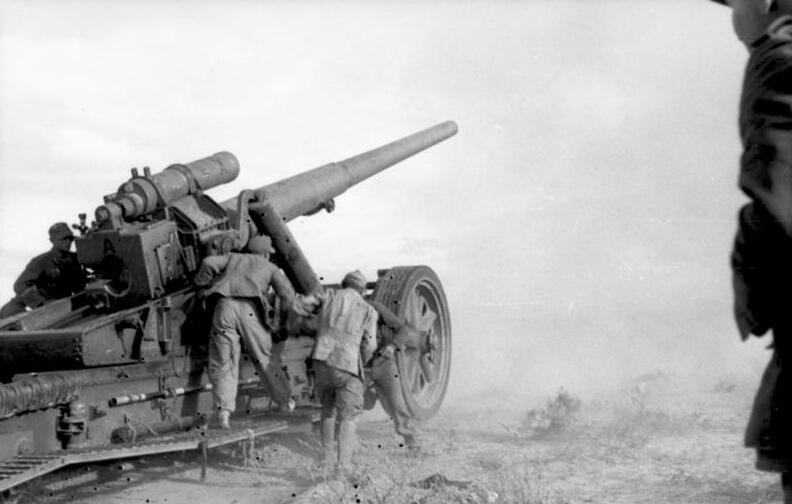

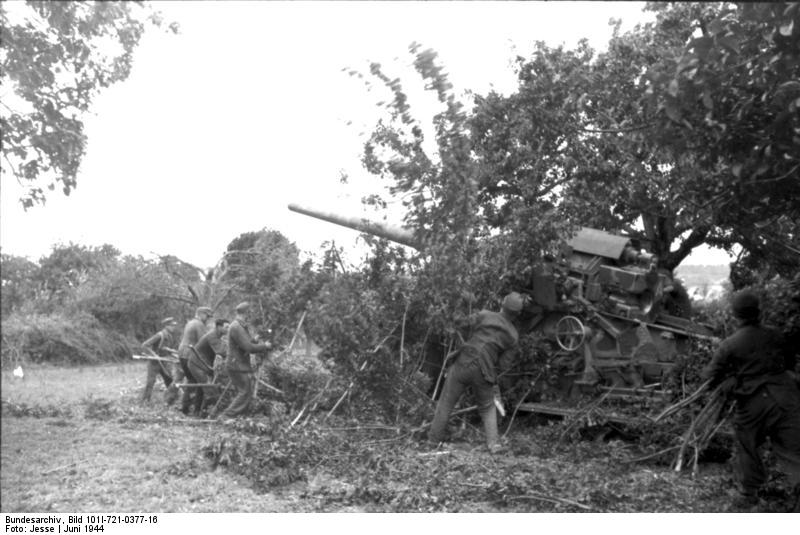

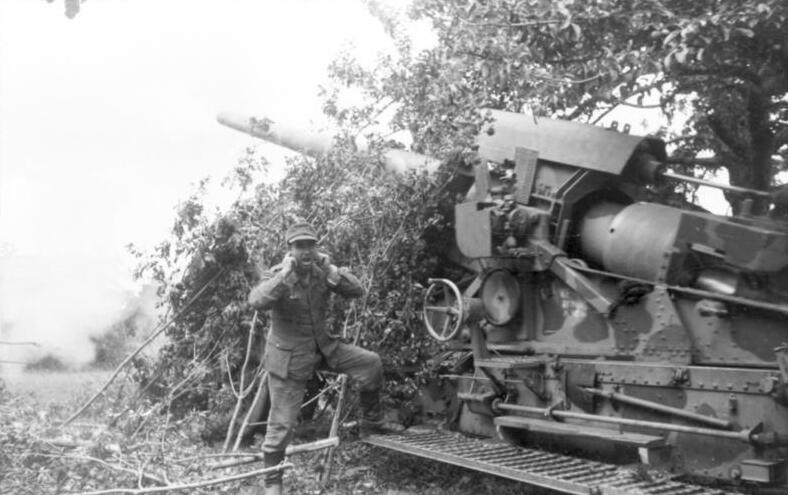

== See also ==
- 17 cm Kanone in Eisenbahnlafette – railway gun of same calibre
- M107 self-propelled gun – post-war US gun of similar calibre
