= Bismarck, Nebraska =

Unincorporated community in Nebraska, United States

- Unincorporated Community
- Location within Nebraska Location within the United States
- Coordinates: 41.9°N 96.9°W
- Country: United States
- State: Nebraska
- County: Cuming

Bismarck is an unincorporated community in Cuming County, Nebraska, United States.

== History ==
A post office was established at Bismarck in 1868, and remained in operation until it was discontinued in 1902. The community was named for Otto von Bismarck, a Prussian statesman and politician.
