= Fauntleroy (disambiguation) =

Fauntleroy (/ˈfɔːntlərɔɪ, ˈfɒnt-/ FAWNT-lə-roy, FONT-) is the main character in the children's novel Little Lord Fauntleroy.

Fauntleroy may also refer to:

- Fauntleroy (surname)
- Fauntleroy (play), a play by John Augustus Stone
- Fauntleroy, Seattle, a neighborhood of West Seattle, Washington, United States
  - Fauntleroy Creek, a stream in the Fauntleroy neighborhood of West Seattle
  - Fauntleroy Park, a park in the Fauntleroy neighborhood of West Seattle
  - Fauntleroy Way SW, a main arterial in West Seattle

== See also ==
- Little Lord Fauntleroy (disambiguation)
- Donald Fauntleroy Duck, an animated cartoon and comic-book character
- Fauntleroy Fox, a character in The Fox and the Crow cartoons
