= Barland =

Barland is a surname. Notable people with the surname include:

- Ragnhild Barland (1934–2015), Norwegian politician
- Thomas H. Barland (born 1930), American lawyer, politician, and judge

== See also ==
- Balland
- Barland Castle, Wales
- Garland (surname)
