= Garland (disambiguation) =

A garland is a type of decoration.

Garland may also refer to:

== Places ==
In the United States

- Garland, Arkansas, a town in Miller County
- Garland County, Arkansas
- Garland, Kansas, a town in Bourbon County
- Garland, Maine, a town in Penobscot County
- Garland, Missouri, an unincorporated community
- Garland, Nebraska, a village in Seward County
- Garland, North Carolina, a town in Sampson County
- Garland, Ohio, an unincorporated community
- Garland, Texas, a suburb of Dallas
  - Garland Independent School District
- Garland, Utah, a city in Box Elder County
- Garland, Wyoming, a village in Park County

== People ==
- Garland (surname), a surname
- Garland Grange (1906–1981), American football player
- Garland Green (1942–2026), American soul singer and pianist
- Garland Gregory (1919–2011), American football player
- Garland Jean-Batiste (born 1965), American football player
- Garland Jeffreys (born 1943), American singer and songwriter
- Garland Kirkpatrick (born 1960), American designer, educator, and curator

== Fiction ==
- Garland, the first boss and the main antagonist of Final Fantasy I
- Garland, an antagonist in Final Fantasy IX
- Garland, a character in 8-Bit Theater
- Garland Siebald, a character from Beyblade
- Garland SF-01, SF-02 and SF-03, race cars in Future GPX Cyber Formula

== Other uses ==
- Ex parte Garland, a United States Supreme Court case concerning presidential pardons
- Garlands (album), an album by the Cocteau Twins
- Garland Publishing, a scholarly publisher, now part of Taylor & Francis Group
  - Garland Encyclopedia of World Music 10 vols. 1989-1994
- HMS Garland, the name of fifteen vessels in the Royal Navy
