= Garland (surname) =

Garland is a surname. Notable people with the surname include:

== Notable people ==
- Ailsa Garland (1917–1982), British fashion journalist, editor of British Vogue
- Alex Garland (born 1970), British novelist and director
- Augustus Hill Garland (1832–1899), American lawyer and politician
- Ben Garland (born 1988), American football player
- Beverly Garland (1926–2008), American actress
- Billy Garland (1918–1960), American guitarist, singer and songwriter
- Bob Garland (1920–2004), Scottish trade unionist
- Chris Garland (1949–2023), English footballer
- Colin Garland (born 1986), Australian footballer
- Conor Garland (born 1996), American ice hockey player
- Dale Garland (born 1980), Guernsey-born British athlete
- Darius Garland (born 2000), American basketball player
- Donald Garland (1918–1940), Irish recipient of the Victoria Cross
- Edward Garland (cricketer) (1826–1882), English cricketer
- Edward Joseph Garland (1887–1974), Canadian farmer, diplomat and politician
- Ed Garland (1895–1980), American jazz bass player
- Hamlin Garland (1860–1940), American novelist and poet
- Hank Garland (1930–2004), Nashville studio musician
- Harry G. Garland (1899–1972), American businessman
- Harry Garland (born 1947), American entrepreneur
- Howard Garland (born 1937), American mathematician
- Jack Garland (disambiguation), several people
- James Garland (disambiguation), several people
- Joanna Garland (born 2001), British-Taiwanese tennis player
- Joe Garland (1903–1977), American jazz musician
- John of Garland (c. 1190 – c. 1270), English grammarian
- John Garland (general) (1792–1861), American soldier
- John J. Garland (1873–1925), Canadian politician
- Jon Garland (born 1979), American baseball player
- Judy Garland (1922–1969), American actress and singer
- Landon Garland (1810–1895), American chemist and natural historian
- Lorraine Garland (born 1963), American folk musician
- Margaret Garland (1893–1976), British artist
- Mahlon Morris Garland (1856–1920), American politician
- Maria Garland (1889–1967), Danish actress
- Mel Garland (1942–1983), American basketball player and coach
- Merrick Garland (born 1952), American judge and Attorney General
- Nicholas Garland (born 1935), British political cartoonist
- Patrick Garland (judge) (1929–2023), British judge
- Patrick Garland (1935–2013), British actor, writer and director
- Peter Garland (composer) (born 1952), American composer
- Peter Garland (footballer) (born 1971), English footballer
- Red Garland (1923–1984), American jazz pianist
- Richard Garland (1927–1969), American actor
- Robert Garland (historian) (born 1947), British classical philologist and historian
- Robert Garland (choreographer) (born 1961), American choreographer
- Roger Garland (born 1933), Irish politician
- Samuel Garland, Jr. (1830–1862), Confederate American Civil War General
- Scott Garland (ice hockey) (1952–1979), Canadian ice hockey player
- Scott Garland (wrestler) (born 1973), American wrestler, known as "Scotty 2 Hotty"
- Seán Garland (1934–2018), Irish politician
- Terry Garland (1953–2021), American blues guitarist, songwriter and singer
- Theodore Garland, Jr. (born 1956), American biologist
- Tim Garland (born 1966), British jazz saxophonist
- Sir Victor Garland (1934–2022), Australian politician and diplomat
- Wayne Garland (born 1950), American baseball player
- Winston Garland (born 1964), American basketball player

== Fictional characters ==
- Anne Garland, heroine of Thomas Hardy's 1880 novel The Trumpet-Major
- Lisa Garland, character in Japanese video game series Silent Hill
