= John Garland =

John Garland may refer to:

- Johannes de Garlandia (philologist) (fl. c. 1205–1255), also called Jean de Garlande, John of Garlande
- Johannes de Garlandia (music theorist) (fl. c. 1270–1320), also called Jean de Garlande, John of Garlande
- John Garland (cricketer) (1875–1938), Australian cricketer
- John Garland (general) (1792–1861), United States career soldier with a notable service during the Mexican-American War
- John Garland (Australian politician) (1862–1921), New South Wales Attorney-General
- John J. Garland (1873–1925), Canadian politician
- John W. Garland, United States university president and lawyer
- Juan Garland (died 1775), an Irish military engineer in the service of Spain

== See also ==
- Jack Garland (disambiguation)
- Jon Garland, Major League Baseball pitcher
- John Garland Pollard, U.S. politician
