= Philippe Delorme =

French historian and journalist

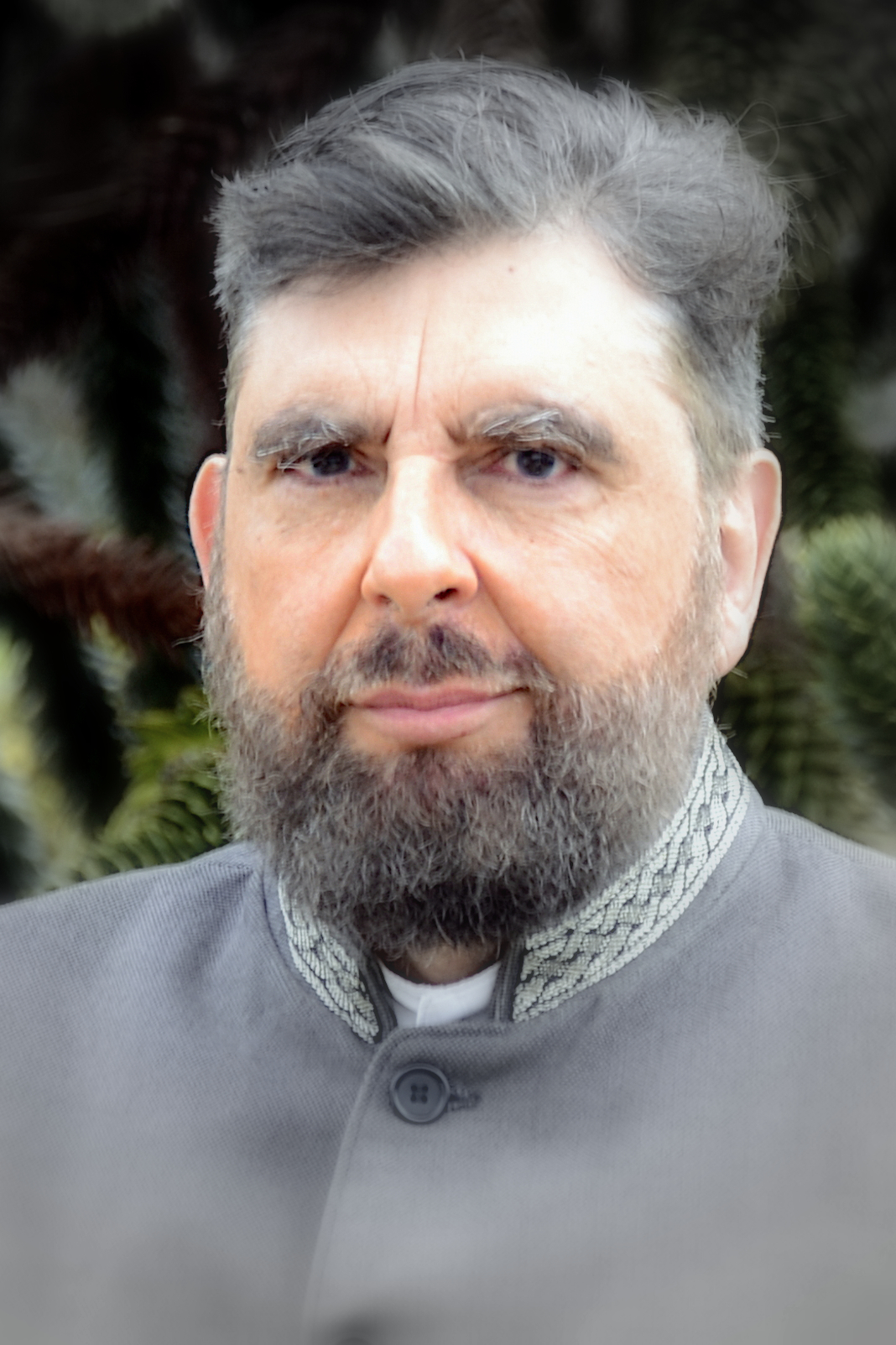
- Philippe Delorme in 2023

Personal details
- Born: Philippe Gilles Delorme; 22 January 1960 (age 66) Pantin, France
- Education: Paris-Sorbonne University
- Profession: Historian; Journalist

Philippe Delorme (born 22 January 1960 in Pantin, Seine-Saint-Denis) is a French historian and journalist, whose articles have appeared in Point de Vue, Point de Vue Histoire, and Valeurs actuelles, among others.

== Biography ==
=== Youth ===
Philippe Delorme grew up in the working-class suburbs of Paris, where he followed the traditional education of public school. In college, a teacher develops his taste for history.

After the baccalaureate, he studied in literary preparatory class at the lycée Janson-de-Sailly, in Paris, then he obtained a Licence and a master's degree in demographic history under the direction of Professor Jean Ganiage, at the University of Paris-Sorbonne (Paris IV) followed by a DEA in 2002.

=== Journalist ===
In 1989, he joined Point de Vue. He collaborated there, as a grand reporter until 2015, then he continued to collaborate there occasionally as an editor. Soon, he is considered by the media as an "historian specialist of royal families".

In March 2016, he joins Valeurs actuelles, where he regularly publishes a chronicle and historical papers.

=== Works on the history of dynasties ===
In 2000, he was one of the promoters of genetic studies carried out on the heart of Louis XVII, kept at the Saint-Denis basilica. This investigation, of which he is responsible for the historical part, concludes that the relic is authentic, without really convincing some people of the end a those two-century-old dispute.

In 2013, he challenged the alleged rediscovery of the mummified head of Henry IV. All of his objections are published in the book La Mauvaise Tête de Henri IV, prefaced by Professor Joël Cornette, of the Paris 8 University. He cosigned also a genetic study on the Y DNA of the Bourbons, confirming the inauthenticity of the head presented as that of Henri IV.

The same year, with Nicolas Doyen and Julien Morvan, he created the association "For the return to Saint-Denis of Charles X and the last of the Bourbons", buried in Slovenia since the 19th century.

=== Awards ===
- Officier de l'ordre des Arts et des Lettres (November 2, 2023)

== Books ==
- Les Rois assassinés (préface de Jacques de Bourbon Busset), éditions Bartillat, 1993-2002, paperback reissue Omnia, 2009
- L'Affaire Louis XVII, éditions Tallandier, 1995-2000
- Clovis 496-1996. Enquête sur le XVe centenaire (avec Luc de Goustine), Régnier, 2009
- Les Grimaldi, 700 ans d'une dynastie, éditions Balland, 1997
- Histoire des Reines de France. Marie de Médicis (préface d'Isabelle d'Orléans-Bragance), Pygmalion, 1998
- Les Princes de la mer (préface de Duarte de Bragance), Balland, 1998, reissue Bartillat, 2005
- Histoire des Reines de France. Anne d'Autriche, Pygmalion, 1999-2011
- Histoire des Reines de France. Marie-Antoinette, Pygmalion, 1999
- Louis XVII, la vérité. Sa mort au Temple confirmée par la science, Pygmalion, 2000
- Histoire des Reines de France. Aliénor d'Aquitaine, Pygmalion, 2001
- Histoire des Reines de France. Blanche de Castille, Pygmalion, 2002
- La Reine mère. Légendes et vérités (préface de Stéphane Bern), Balland, 2002
- Les Aventuriers de Dieu, Jean Picollec, 2002
- Histoire des Reines de France. Isabeau de Bavière, Pygmalion, 2003
- Le Prince. L'incroyable destin de Rainier de Monaco (préface de Françoise Laot), Balland, 2004, réédition complétée sous le titre Rainier. Un prince de légende, éditions Michel Lafon, 2005
- Scandaleuses princesses, Pygmalion, 2005; new edition, revised and supplemented, Express Roularta, 2012
- Albert II de Monaco. Les surprises du prince (préface de Jacqueline Monsigny et Edward Meeks), Michel Lafon, 2006
- L'homme qui rêvait d'être roi. Entretien avec Henri comte de Paris (préface d'Henri d'Orléans), éditions Buchet-Chastel, 2006
- Les Princes du malheur. Le destin tragique des enfants de Louis XVI et Marie-Antoinette, éditions Perrin, 2008
- Henri comte de Chambord. Journal (1846-1883). Carnets inédits. Texte établi et annoté (préface de Françoise de Bourbon-Parme), François-Xavier de Guibert, 2009
- Les Dynasties du monde, collection « Point de vue », Express Roularta, 2009
- Henri IV, les réalités d'un mythe, éditions de l'Archipel, 2010
- 365 jours d'Histoire royale, collection « Point de vue », Express Roularta, 2010
- William et Catherine, 150 ans de noces royales en Grande-Bretagne, collection « Point de vue », Express Roularta, 2011
- Charlène et ces drôles de dames de Monaco (préface de Charles de Bourbon des Deux-Siciles), collection « Point de vue », Express Roularta, 2011
- Les Dynasties perdues (préface de Siméon II de Bulgarie), collection « Point de vue », Express Roularta, 2011, 286 pages ISBN 978-2-84343-855-4
- La Mauvaise Tête de Henri IV : contre-enquête sur une prétendue découverte (préface de Joël Cornette), F. Aimard Éditeur/Y. Briend Éditeur, 2013
- Rois et princes en 1914, Tours, éditions Alan Sutton, 2014
- Histoire des reines de France : Anne de Kiev, Pygmalion, 2015,
- Louis XVII, la biographie, Via Romana, 2015
- Élisabeth II: les jeunes années d'une reine, Editions Sutton, 2016
- Rois et princes en 1939, Editions Sutton, 2016
- Théories folles de l'histoire, Presses de la Cité, 2016 ISBN 978-2258134041
- Petites histoires du quotidien des rois - Été, VA Press, 2017 ISBN 979-10-93240-27-5
- Petites histoires du quotidien des rois - Automne, VA Press, 2017 ISBN 979-10-93240-28-2
- Philippe d'Édimbourg, une vie au service de Sa Majesté, Tallandier, 2017 ISBN 979-1021020351
- Les Plus Belles Heures de Monaco et des Grimaldi, La Boîte à Pandore, 2017 ISBN 978-2875572219
- Petites histoires du quotidien des rois - Hiver, VA Press, 2017 ISBN 979-10-93240-29-9
- Ombres et mystères de l'Histoire, Tallandier, 2018 ISBN 9791021030466
- Mariages de légende à la cour d'Angleterre - Deux siècles d'amour et de trahison, Éditions Jourdan, 2018 ISBN 978-28-74665011
- Dictionnaire insolite des dynasties du monde, Éditions Via Romana, 2019 ISBN 978-2372711326
- La Légende de Notre-Dame (anthology, choice and presentation of texts), Éditions du Cerf, 2019 ISBN 978-2204135962
- Les Énigmes de l'Histoire, Éditions de l'Opportun, 2019 ISBN 978-2360757510
- Les Incroyables Énigmes de l'Histoire, Éditions de l'Opportun, 2020 ISBN 978-2380150261
- Les Rois éphémères, Éditions du Cerf, 2020 ISBN 978-2204111676
- L'Île aux chimères, Éditions du Trésor, 2020 ISBN 979-1091534604
- La Momie hurlante et autres énigmes de l'Histoire, Éditions Jourdan, 2022 ISBN 978-2874667077
- Contre-Histoire de France, ni romance ni repentance, la vérité sur notre passé, Éditions Ring, 2022 ISBN 978-2379340253, Éditions Via Romana, 2024 ISBN 978-2379340253
- Le vrai docteur Frankenstein et autres secrets de l'histoire, Éditions du Cerf, 2023 ISBN 978-2204157179
- Couronnes, Éditions Dervy, 2025 ISBN 979-1024218014
