= Edward Garland =

Edward Garland may refer to:

- Ed Garland (1895–1980), New Orleans jazz string bass player
- Edward Garland (cricketer) (1826–1882), English cricketer
- Edward Joseph Garland (1887–1974), Canadian farmer, diplomat and federal politician

== See also ==
- Donald Edward Garland (1918–1940), Irish recipient of the Victoria Cross
