= Fauntleroy (surname) =

Fauntleroy (/ˈfɔːntlərɔɪ, ˈfɒnt-/ FAWNT-lə-roy, FONT-) is a surname and middle name. Notable people with the surname and middle name include:

== Surname ==
- Archibald Magill Fauntleroy (1837–1886), American physician
- Cedric Fauntleroy (1891–1973), American pilot
- Don E. FauntLeRoy (born 1953), American cinematographer and film director
- Henry Fauntleroy (1784–1824), English banker and forger
- James Fauntleroy (born 1984), American musician and songwriter
- Thomas T. Fauntleroy (soldier) (1796–1883), American soldier
- Thomas T. Fauntleroy (lawyer) (1823–1894), American lawyer
- William Fauntleroy, 16th-century English clergyman.

== Middle name ==
- Constance Faunt Le Roy Runcie (1836–1911), American musician
- Hubert Fauntleroy Julian (1897–1983), American aviator
- James Fauntleroy Garland (1850–1915), American politician
- Marietta Fauntleroy Minnigerode Andrews (1869–1931), American painter and designer
- Susannah Fauntleroy Quarles Nicholson (1804–1858), American painter.

== See also ==
- Fauntleroy (disambiguation)
