= Fauntleroy Park =

Park in Seattle, Washington, United States

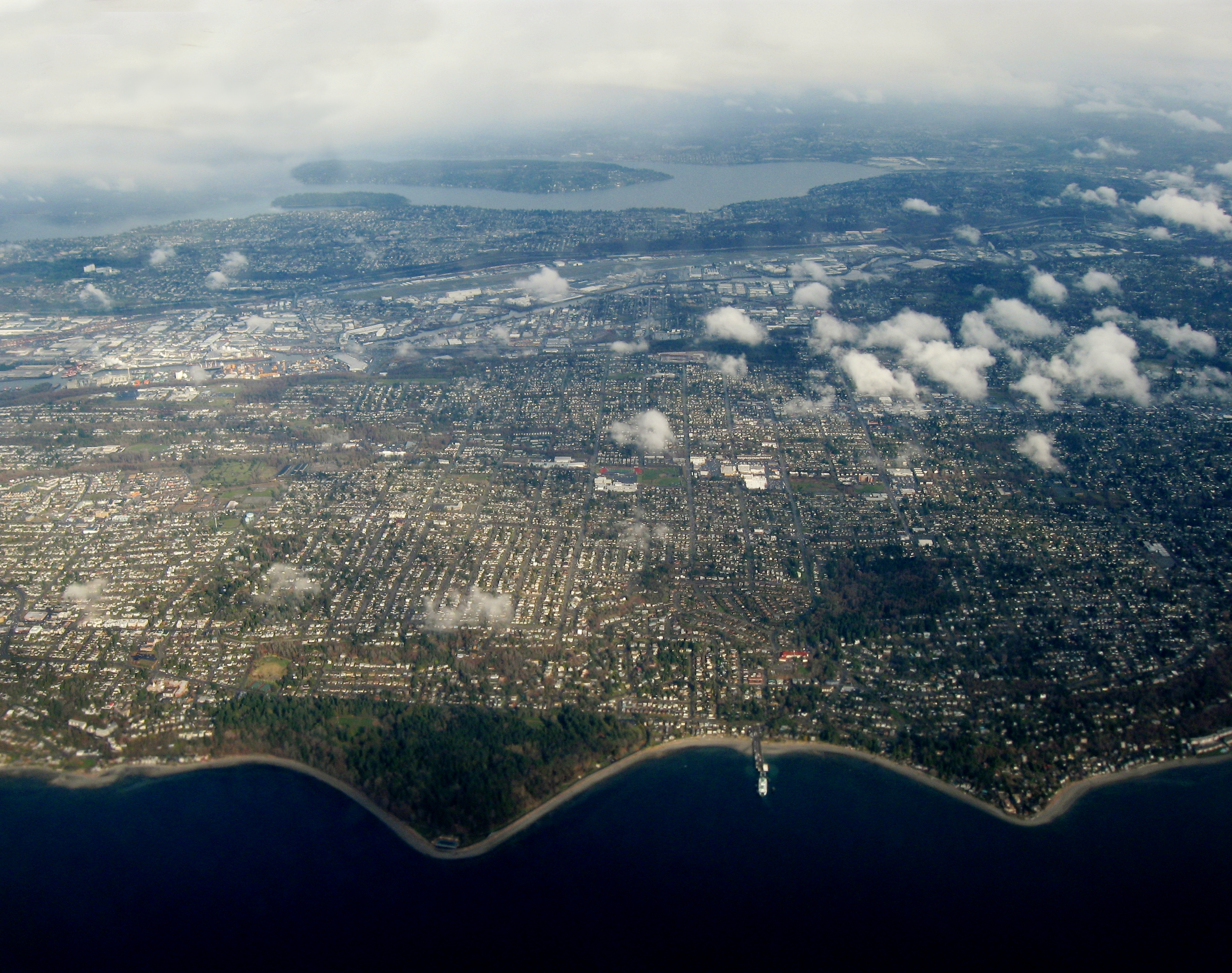
- Fauntleroy Park is the smaller wooded area to the upper right of Lincoln Park, the forested point on the water
- Interactive map of Fauntleroy Park
- Type: Urban park
- Location: Seattle, Washington
- Coordinates: 47.518998°N 122.383068°W
- Area: 32.9 acres (13.3 ha)
- Operator: Seattle Parks and Recreation

Fauntleroy Park is a 32.9-acre (13.3 ha) park in the Fauntleroy neighborhood of Seattle, Washington. Fauntleroy Creek begins here. Nearby Lincoln Park was called Fauntleroy Park until 1922.

The steep slopes that make up over 30% of the heavily wooded park rendered the land unbuildable, saving this property from the development of the adjacent neighborhood that began in the first decade of the 20th century and continued for more than half a century. The city acquired the land for a park in 1971. Unlike many Seattle parks, much of Fauntleroy Park remains essentially native habitat, a forest remnant undergoing natural succession. 18 acres of the park consists of hardwood and riparian forest; there are about 10 acres of conifer and mixed forests and approximately 5 acres of wetlands. Volunteers have been removing non-native weeds since 1996.

Although within city limits, the park is a natural green space and wildlife habitat including the headwaters of a historically fish-bearing stream, Fauntleroy Creek, rather than an urban park. The stream was once home to cutthroat trout; these are no longer found there, but local schoolchildren have restored stream habitat and stocked the stream with Coho salmon. Human activities there are generally limited to low-impact recreation such as walking, birdwatching and other observing of nature; it is not a site for more aggressive trail use such as mountain biking, and it lacks facilities for organized sports.

A local organization, the Friends of Fauntleroy Park founded in 1996, advocates for the park, with a focus on preservation and restoration of the park as a natural area, public education and use, and stewardship. Two other organizations focus on the watershed that has its headwaters in the park: Friends of Fauntleroy Creek, established 1989, and the Fauntleroy Creek Watershed Council, established 2001. The United Church of Christ Fauntleroy Church, adjacent to the park is listed as "Fauntleroy Community Church and YMCA" is a Seattle landmark.
