= Northwest Trolls: Way of the Bird King =

Public art installation in the Pacific Northwest, U.S.

- Bruun Idun in Lincoln Park, West Seattle, Washington, 2026
- Artist: Thomas Dambo
- Medium: Sculpture

Northwest Trolls: Way of the Bird King is a public art project featuring sculptures of Nordic trolls made from recycled materials by Danish artist Thomas Dambo. Statues were installed in Bainbridge Island, Issaquah, Portland, and Vashon Island. Seattle saw installations in Ballard and West Seattle.

The project is funded in part by the Paul G. Allen Family Foundation, and managed by the Seattle-based Scan Design Foundation.

== Sculptures ==
Each troll has a name:

- Pia the Peacekeeper – Bainbridge Island
- Jakob Two Trees – Issaquah
- Ole Bolle – Nordic Northwest, Southwest Portland, Oregon
- Oscar the Bird King – Vashon Island
- Frankie Feetsplinters – Ballard
- Bruun Idun – Lincoln Park, West Seattle

== Gallery ==
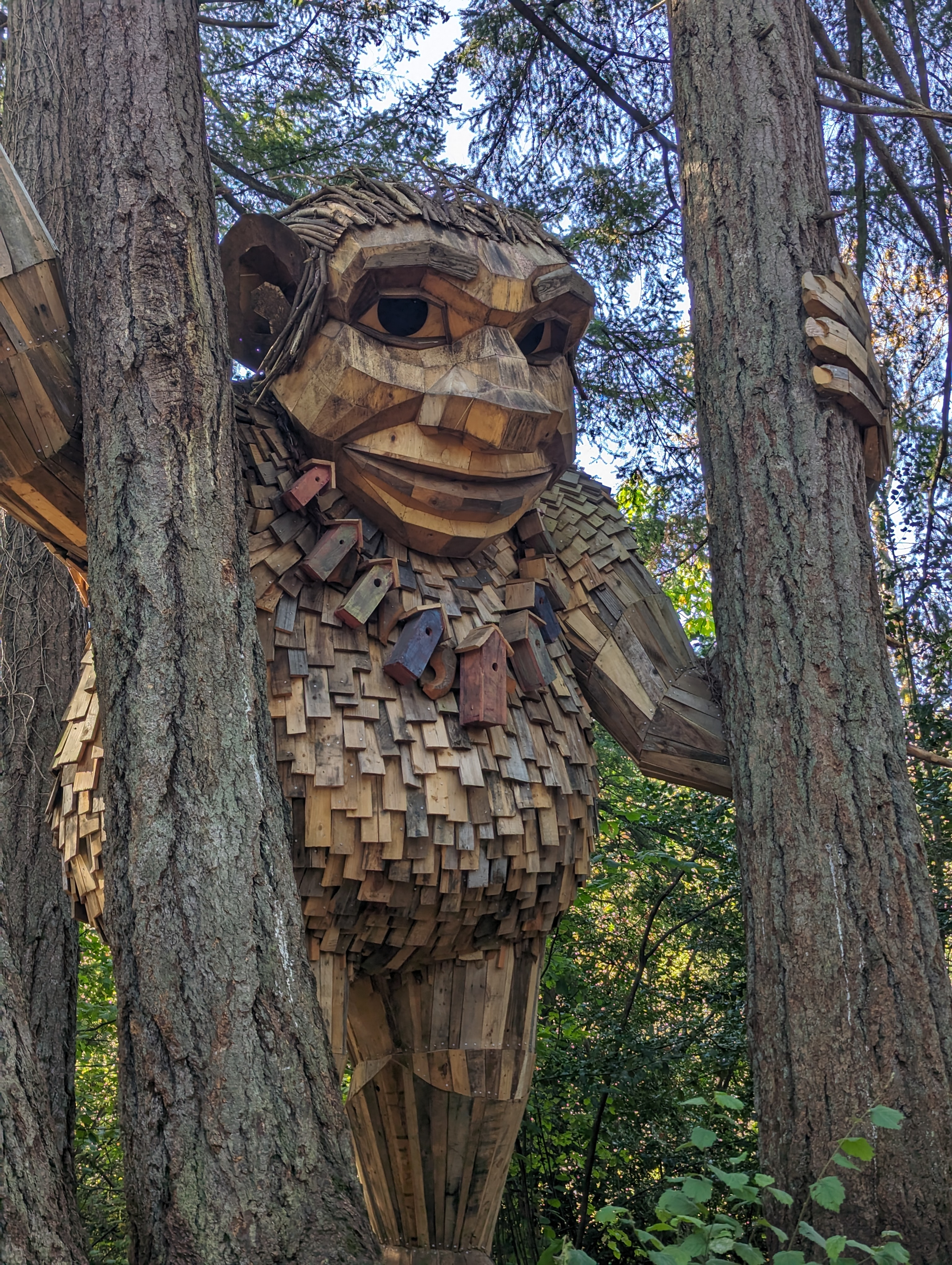
"Jakob Two Trees" in Issaquah

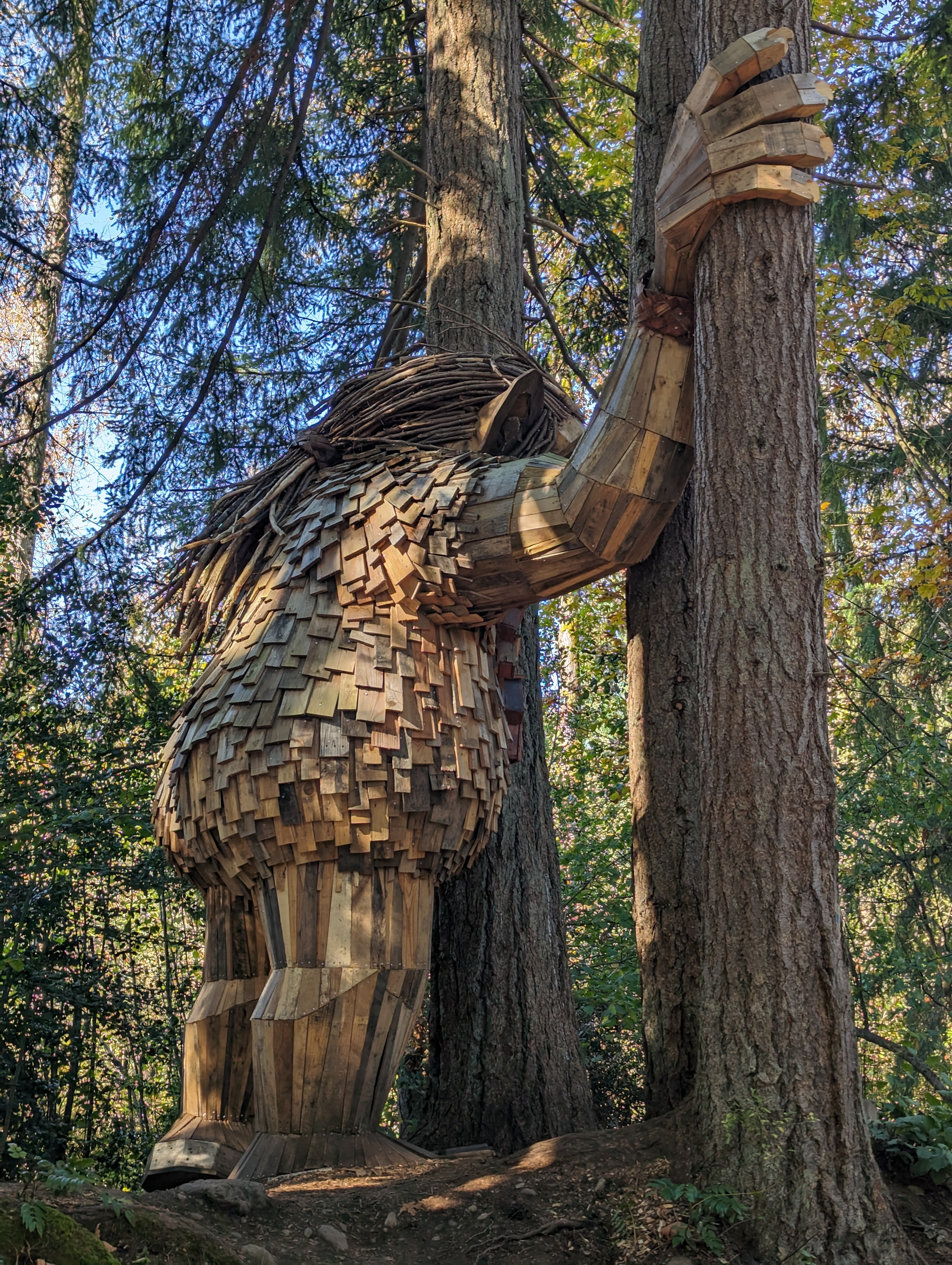
"Jakob Two Trees", rear view, in Issaquah

== See also ==
- Fremont Troll, another sculpture of a troll in Seattle
