= James Garland =

James Garland may refer to:

- James Garland (Virginia politician) (1791–1885), politician and lawyer from Virginia
- James Garland (Australian politician) (1813–1904), member of the New South Wales Legislative Assembly
- James C. Garland (born 1942), physicist, author and president of Miami University, Oxford, Ohio
- James Henry Garland (born 1931), bishop of the Catholic Church in the United States
- James F. Garland, American politician in the Virginia House of Delegates
