= HMS Garland =

Many ships of the Royal Navy have been named HMS Garland. The name dates back to 1242, being the oldest confirmed ship name in the Royal Navy.

- English ship Garland (1590) (or Guardland), a 38/48-gun galleon, built in 1590 and sunk in 1618.
- Topsham ship Garland, containing possessions of Charles I of England, wrecked on Godrevy Island in Cornwall on the day Charles was executed 30 January 1649.
- English ship Garland (1620), a middling ship launched in 1620, and captured by the Dutch in 1652.
- HMS Garland (1660), a 30-gun ship launched in 1654 and originally called Grantham, renamed Garland in 1660, became a fireship in 1688, upgraded to a fifth rate frigate in 1689 and finally sold in 1698.
- HMS Garland (1703), a 44-gun fifth-rate frigate launched in 1703, and wrecked in 1709.
- HMS Garland (1712), a 32-gun fifth-rate frigate, originally named HMS Scarborough, launched in 1696. Captured by the French in 1710 off the coast of Guinea, recaptured in 1712 and renamed Garland and used as a fireship; sold in 1744.
- HMS Garland (1748), a 24-gun sixth-rate post ship launched in 1748 and sold in 1783. She then became the slave ship Garland. She made six full slave trading voyages starting in 1784, and was wrecked off Barbados in 1792 after having delivered a seventh cargo of slaves.
- HMS Garland (1762), originally a French 20-gun frigate called Guirlande, captured in 1762. She was possibly hulked in 1768, having never been commissioned.
- HMS Garland, a 28-gun sixth-rate frigate launched in 1779 as Sibyl, renamed Garland in 1795, and wrecked in 1798 off Madagascar.
- HMS Garland (1798), a 6-gun schooner purchased in 1798 and sold in March 1803.
- HMS Garland (1800), originally a French 22-gun privateer called Mars that HMS Amethyst captured in 1800 and that was wrecked in 1803 in the West Indies.
- HMS Garland (1807), a 22-gun Laurel-class sixth-rate post ship launched in 1807 and sold in 1817.
- HMS Garland (1846), a wooden paddle packet launched in 1846, and sold in 1855.
- HMS Garland (1856), a Cheerful-class screw gunboat launched in 1856, and broken up in 1864.
- HMS Garland (1913), an Acasta-class destroyer launched in 1913 that fought at the Battle of Jutland. Sold in 1921.
- HMS Garland (H37), a G-class destroyer launched in 1935. Served with the Polish Navy as ORP Garland from 1940 to 1946. Sold to the Dutch navy in 1947 and broken up in 1964.
