= Garland Kirkpatrick =

American designer and educator (born 1960)

Garland Kirkpatrick (born 1960) is an American designer, educator, and curator based in Los Angeles.

== Career ==
Post graduate work at the Institute of Design in Chicago (1985-1987), he received his Master of Fine Arts in Graphic Design (1990) from Yale University where he studied under modernist designers, Armin Hofmann and Paul Rand.

Kirkpatrick's graphic design work has been recognized by three national competitions for graphic design: the American Alliance of Museums' national museum publication competition; the American Center for Design (ACD) 100 show (1927-2002); and the American Institute of Graphic Arts (AIGA) Communication Graphics competition. He received the City of Los Angeles (COLA) Individual Artist Fellowship for Design from the Department of Cultural Affairs (2003), and subsequent design consulting grants for exhibition graphics and publications in 2007, 2014, 2020, 2021, and 2025.

His work is held in the permanent collections of: the American Institute of Graphic Arts Design Archives (AIGA); the Denver Art Museum, AIGA Awards Archive, Denver, CO (1991–Present); the Caridad Archive of Chicano Printmaking in California (CEMA), University of California, Santa Barbara; the Center for the Study of Political Graphics; the Design Museum of Chicago, Great Ideas of Humanity: One of a Series (2025); the eMuseum of the Museum of Design, Zurich University of the Arts, Switzerland; Self Help Graphics & Art, Los Angeles; the Gerald Buck Collection, University of California, Irvine, California; the Huntington Museum, University of Texas-Austin, Austin, Texas; the Institute of Texas Cultures, University of Texas-San Antonio, San Antonio, Texas; the Los Angeles County Museum of Art; and the Online Archives of California.

== Filmography ==
His graphic designs have appeared in the independent film directed by Richard Linklater, Fast Food Nation (2006), the political thriller directed by Charles Liburd, Game (2013), and Digging the Suez Canal with a Teaspoon (2019), a documentary film by David Stairs and Eric Limarenko.

== Bibliography ==
- Garland Kirkpatrick, One Down: Fix the 115th House, 2017, ink and digital collage, African American Heritage Calendar & Cultural Guide, (Los Angeles Department of Cultural Affairs, January 2018), 162. (Illustration)
- Dooley, Michael, “Designer Garland Kirkpatrick: Keeping Social Issues Alive,” Print Magazine, October 28, 2017 (Online Review).
- y Montoya, Will Caperton, COLA Printed Matter, COLA 20: City of Los Angeles Individual Artist Fellowships, (Department of Cultural Affairs, Los Angeles, 2017), 78, 81, 84. (Catalogue)
- Milton Glaser, Mirco Illic, and Steven Heller, eds. The Design of Dissent: Expanded Edition: Greed, Nationalism, Alternative Facts, and the Resistance. (Beverly: Rockport Publishers, 2017), 171. (Reproduction)
- ''African American Heritage Month, Calendar and Cultural Guide'', City of Los Angeles Department of Cultural Affairs, 2017, p. 39 (Catalogue)
- Center for the Study of Political Graphics, Poster of the Week: "Ban the Box," Social graphic activism on the civil rights of ex-offenders, persuading employers to remove "The box" from the hiring applications for the formerly incarcerated. November 2015.
- "Art and Art History Professor Included Among Noted Designers," Vistas, Spring 2009, p. 6
- Bohn-Spector, Claudia, "Remnants of the Real," Curator: Claudia Bohn-Spector, pp. 12, 36–39, 2009 (Catalogue)
- African American Heritage Month, Calendar and Cultural Guide, City of Los Angeles Department of Cultural Affairs, 2009, p. 32 (Catalogue)
- Shirky, Clay, "In Less Than 20 Years the Internet Has Transformed...," What Matters: Ten Questions That Will Shape Our Future, McKinsey & Company, p. 117, January 2009 (Illustration)
- Lowry, Camille, "Design Journeys: Garland Kirkpatrick," American Institute of Graphic Arts (Biography: 2008)
- Style Wars: Dissecting the Candidate's Graphics, National Public Radio: News and Views, March 4, 2008 (Interview)
- Gardner, Belinda, "In Geheimer PR-Mission," ArtNet Magazine, 2006 (Reproduction)
- Maya Drozdz, Outside In: An International Poster Exhibit, Lulu Publishing, 2006 (Catalogue)
- Milton Glaser and Mirco Illic, The Design of Dissent: Socially and Politically Driven Graphics, Rockport Publishers, 2005, p. 171 (Reproduction)
- "Graphic Designing for Economic Justice," Santa Monica Daily Press, April 11, 2005, p. 3 (Quote)
- Triumph of Our Communities, Arizona State University Press, 2005, p. 102 (Reproduction)
- Axis of Evil: Perforated Prætor Naturam, Qualiatica Press, Chicago, 2004, pp. 76, 204 (Reproduction)
- Buchanan, Richard, Dennis Doordan, Victor Margolin, "Twenty Two Years of Pluralistic Discourse," Design Issues: Volume 20, Number 1 Winter 2004, p. 5, Massachusetts Institute of Technology Press, (Mention)
- Cannon, Sara, City of Los Angeles (COLA) Individual Artist Fellowships, 2003, City of Los Angeles Department of Cultural Affairs, pp. 41–44 (Catalogue)
- Myers, Holly, "Relationships at Play in the Physical World," Los Angeles Times, July 19, 2003 (Review)
- LA Arts Mix, City of Los Angeles Individual Artist Fellowships, No. 11, LA City View, 2003 (Video Interview)
- We Shall Not Be Moved: Posters, Gentrification, and Resistance in the Figueroa Corridor, SAJE/CSPG/Self Help Graphics, Los Angeles, 2003, pp. 27, 35, 43 (Reproduction and interview)
- American Institute of Graphic Arts, AIGA Graphic Design, USA 20, New York, 1999, p. 176 (Award)
- Jan van Toorn, Design Beyond Design, Critical Reflection and the Practice of Visual Communication, Maastricht, Netherlands, Jan van Eyck Akademie Editions, 1998, pp. 17, 18, 182, 183 (Ministry of Information-Watts Towers Arts Center, Poster- exhibition of student works); (Second edition, Seoul Korea, 2004)
- 18th Annual 100 Show: American Center for Design, Chicago, 1995, p. 141 (Award)
- 15th Annual 100 Show: American Center for Design, Chicago, 1993, p. 122 (Award)
- American Institute of Graphic Arts, AIGA Graphic Design USA 14, New York, 1993, p. 141 (Award)
- Carbone, Ken, "Communication Graphis Awards," Graphis Magazine, no. 278, Zurich, Switzerland, March/April, 1992, pp. 52, 53 (Award)
- American Institute of Graphic Arts, AIGA Graphic Design USA 12, New York, 1991, p. 121 (Award)
