= Fauntleroy Creek =

Stream in West Seattle, Washington, U.S.

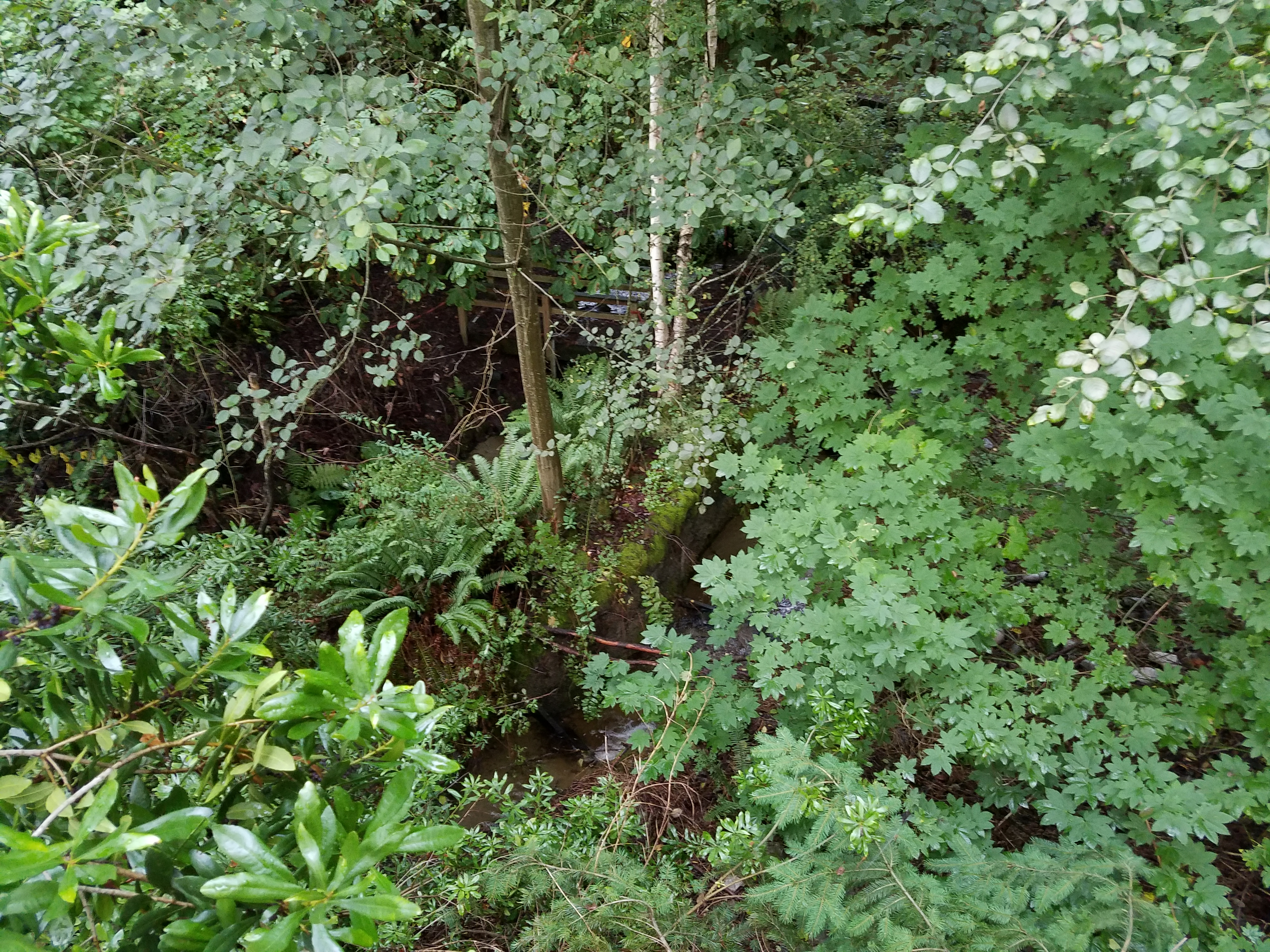
View down into the Fauntleroy Creek ravine.

Fauntleroy Creek is a stream in the Fauntleroy neighborhood of West Seattle, Washington, United States. It flows for about a mile from its headwaters in the 32-acre (129,000 m^{2}) ravine of Fauntleroy Park, through a large wide pipe and to a location just south of the state ferry terminal on Puget Sound's Fauntleroy Cove. Then, it drops 300 feet (100 m) vertically along the way, and it currently supports cutthroat trout and Coho salmon.

The creek, park, and neighborhood were named after the cove, itself named by one George Davidson in 1857 after his fiancée, Ellinor Fauntleroy. Today Fauntleroy creek is an active home for salmon and trout including a record 347 spawners in 2024. It is one of only a few creeks in the Seattle Area where salmon still return.

The creek was saved in the 1990s when at times, no salmon returned to spawn. Through many years of hard work by volunteers, the creek brought to its current state. Since then, many volunteers have moved to projects at Longfellow Creek helping to restore salmon there as well. A major part of both projects was releasing salmon fry in the late winter by school children. Longfellow creek now holds a sizable salmon population as well.
