= Little Lord Fauntleroy (disambiguation) =

Little Lord Fauntleroy is an 1886 children's novel written by Frances Hodgson Burnett.

Little Lord Fauntleroy may also refer to:

- Little Lord Fauntleroy (1914 film), a silent film featuring John Marlborough East
- Little Lord Fauntleroy (murder victim), an unidentified boy whose body was discovered in March 1921 in Wisconsin
- Little Lord Fauntleroy (1921 film), a silent film starring Mary Pickford released September
- Little Lord Fauntleroy (1936 film), a film starring Freddie Bartholemew and Dolores Costello
- Little Lord Fauntleroy (1980 film), a film starring Rick Schroder, Alec Guinness, and Eric Porter
- Little Lord Fauntleroy (TV series), a 43-episode anime that aired in 1988
- "Little Lord Fontleroy", a 2001 song by Quasi from The Sword of God
