= Barland Castle =

Castle in Old Radnor, Powys, Wales

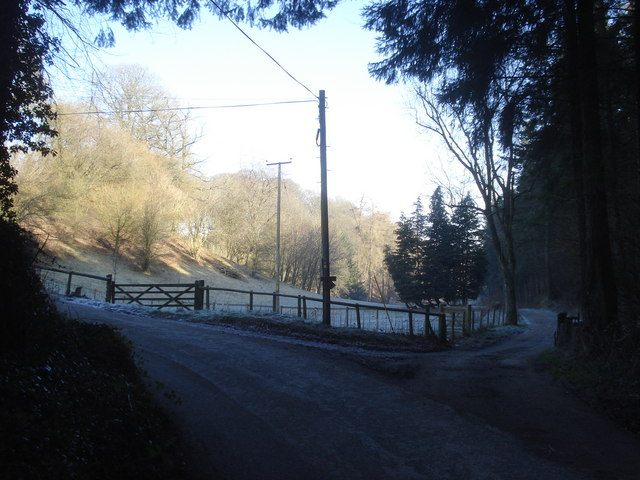
- The clearing and motte at Barland in 2008.

Site information
- Type: Motte-and-bailey castle
- Condition: Only the mound and ditch remain.

Location
- Coordinates: 52.2500°N 3.0546°W

Site history
- Materials: Wood

Barland Castle, also known as Bishopston Old Castle, was a motte-and-bailey castle located near the village of Old Radnor, in Radnorshire (modern-day Powys), Wales. It is believed to have been described in the Domesday Book under the ownership of Hugh L'Asne, who owned the nearby lands. An excavation took place in 1898, which found pottery shards and other artefacts dated to the late 12th to early 13th century. The name is suspected to have slowly changed over time, from "Bernoldune," to "Beraldon," "Barlondon" and finally "Barlonde." All that remains is a ditch and a stepped bank, which may contain tumbled remains of masonry; 19th century excavations showed evidence of a wooden palisade.

== Description ==
Barland Castle was thought to be a motte-and-bailey castle, of which only the motte mound now remains. The mound measures 23–26 metres (75–85 ft) in diameter, and is 3.2 metres (10 ft) in height. It is banked by a ditch some 13 metres (43 ft) wide to the north and a further ditch to the north west. These two ditches may be as a result of former buildings on the site. It is located 0.7 kilometres (0.43 mi) north east of St Teilo's Church, Bishopston.

== History ==
In the Domesday Book, the ownership of the nearby lands are placed in the hands of Hugh L'Asne (Hugh the Ass). He had ownership of several nearby settlements, including Old Radnor and Burlingjobb. This was occupied by a knight named Turchil on Hugh's behalf, and at the time was called "Bernoldune." Less than a century later, the location was the property of William de Braose, 2nd Baron Braose, by this time it was called "Bernoldona." It passed down the line into the hands of Edmund Mortimer, 2nd Baron Mortimer, who listed at the time of his death, "Beraldon. Half a knight's fee held by John Peytevyn." The other locations listed as holdings were all in the vicinity of Radnor, with the exception of one, Bourton, Buckinghamshire. It is on this basis that these medieval mentions are thought to be Barland.

The first specific mention of a castle at the location was in the will and testament of Peter Skydmore, which made reference to a marriage agreement with Rice ap John ap Richard ap Madoc of "Barlondon and Burwaire within the lordship of the castle at New Radnor." Writing in the Radnorshire Society transactions journal in 1961, E.J.L. Cole proposed that Barlondon was a transposition of the sounds of Beraldon, with the change having taken place at some point between 1425 and 1450. By 1545, the castle was being referred to as "Barlonde" and had been mortgaged by John a'Madog to Roger Davies of Norton. It was subsequently bequeathed by Davies to his daughter Elinor and her husband Richard Blackbache.

== Archaeological investigations ==
In 1898, an excavation took place at the Barland Castle site by Lt. Colonel W.Ll. Morgan, which revealed the sockets of rows of timber stakes around the edge of the bank, indicating that a heavy defensive palisade was once located there. Morgan made three cuts into the bank, revealing a 2.5 metres (8.2 ft) deep v-shaped ditch in the rampart and identifying the location of two separate rows of stakes some 1.83 metres (6.0 ft) apart. The forward row of stakes measured between 6.4–11.4 centimetres (2.5–4.5 in) in diameter, and were placed an average of 30 centimetres (12 in) apart from each other. The rear row was less uniform. While no evidence was found of a building on top of the mound, late 12th to early 13th century pottery shards were discovered, along with a belt buckle and the soles of leather shoes.

Following Cole's proposal that Barland was an evolution in naming which started with "Bernoldune," Rennell Rodd, 1st Baron Rennell investigated the idea in 1962. He traveled to the Barland site and, based on the size of the location matching that described in the Domesday Book, supported Cole's hypothesis that the two were linked. However, he felt that any later manor building would have been located at the nearby Burfa farm rather than on or near the mound itself. The site is on private land.
