= Margaret Garland =

British artist (1893-1976)

- Born: 1893; Oxford, England
- Died: 1976 (aged 82–83)
- Known for: Painting

Margaret Vallis Mary Lester Garland (1893-1976) was a British artist known as a painter of landscapes and figure subjects.

== Biography ==
Garland was born in Oxford and attended the Royal College of Art design school between 1925 and 1927. There she met Helen Binyon and they became lifelong friends. After graduating from the Royal College she began to exhibit with the New English Art Club and also received a commission to create a mural for the Holy Trinity Church in Bath. The mural was completed but destroyed by bombing during World War II. After the War, Garland remained in Bath where she taught at the Bath Art School for a brief period and then at the Bath Academy of Art under Clifford Ellis from 1946 to 1958. As well as exhibiting with the Bath Society of Artists, Garland had exhibitions at the Barber Institute of Fine Arts in Birmingham and at the Arcade Gallery, the Leva Gallery and at the David Paul Gallery in Chichester during 1978.
