= John W. Garland =

7th President of Central State University
- In office 1997–2012

Personal details
- Education: Central State (B.A.); Ohio State (J.D.)
- Occupation: Professor; Lawyer; Administrator

John W. Garland is an American lawyer and education leader. He served as the seventh president of the Central State University and the first president-in-residence at the Thurgood Marshall College Fund.

== Early life and education ==
Garland received his bachelor's degree in political science from Central State University in 1971. He then received a J.D. degree from Ohio State University Moritz College of Law in 1974. Garland earned a Purple Heart for wounds he received while serving as an infantry squad leader in Vietnam.

== Career ==
Garland began his career in higher education in 1988 as general counsel for the University of the District of Columbia. In 1991 he was named Associate General Counsel/Special Assistant Attorney General for the University of Virginia. In 1993 he was appointed to the position of executive assistant to the president of University of Virginia and eventually became associate vice provost for intellectual property. While at Virginia he was a member of the general faculty and taught undergraduate classes. In 1997 Garland returned to his alma mater to become the seventh president of Central State University. After leaving CSU, Garland endowed a fund in the names of him and his wife, Carolyn Farrow.

In June 2022, the Central State University Board of Trustees adopted a Resolution naming the John W. Garland College of Engineering, Science, Technology, and Agriculture to honor Garland's successful efforts in obtaining 1890 Land Grant Status for the University.

== Personal life ==
Garland lives in LeDroit Park, a historic neighborhood in Washington, DC.

Academic offices
| Preceded by Arthur E. Thomas | Central State University; 1997-2012 | Succeeded by Cynthia Jackson-Hammond |
