= Fauntleroy, Seattle =

- Seattle Neighborhood
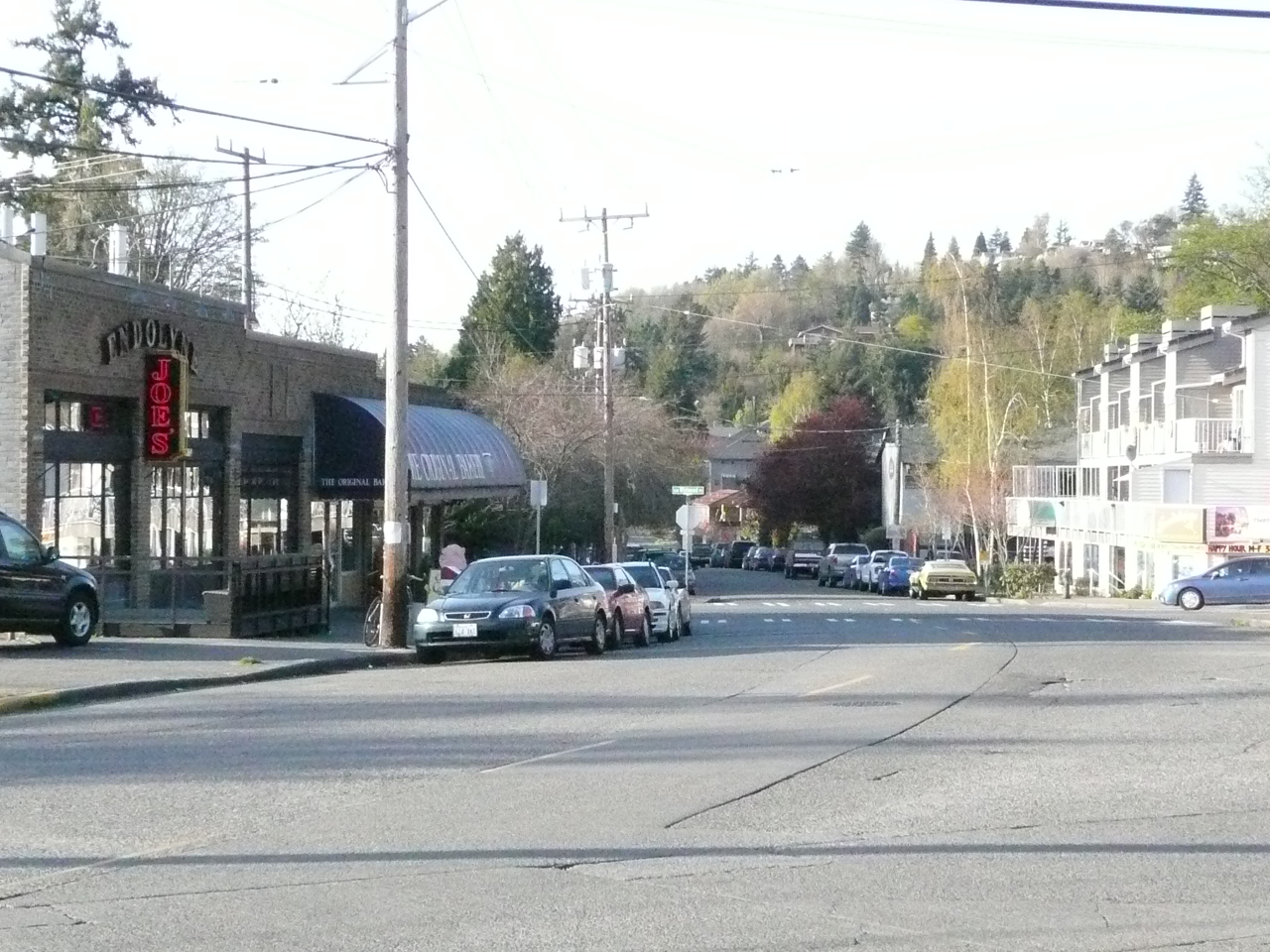
- Fauntleroy commercial area

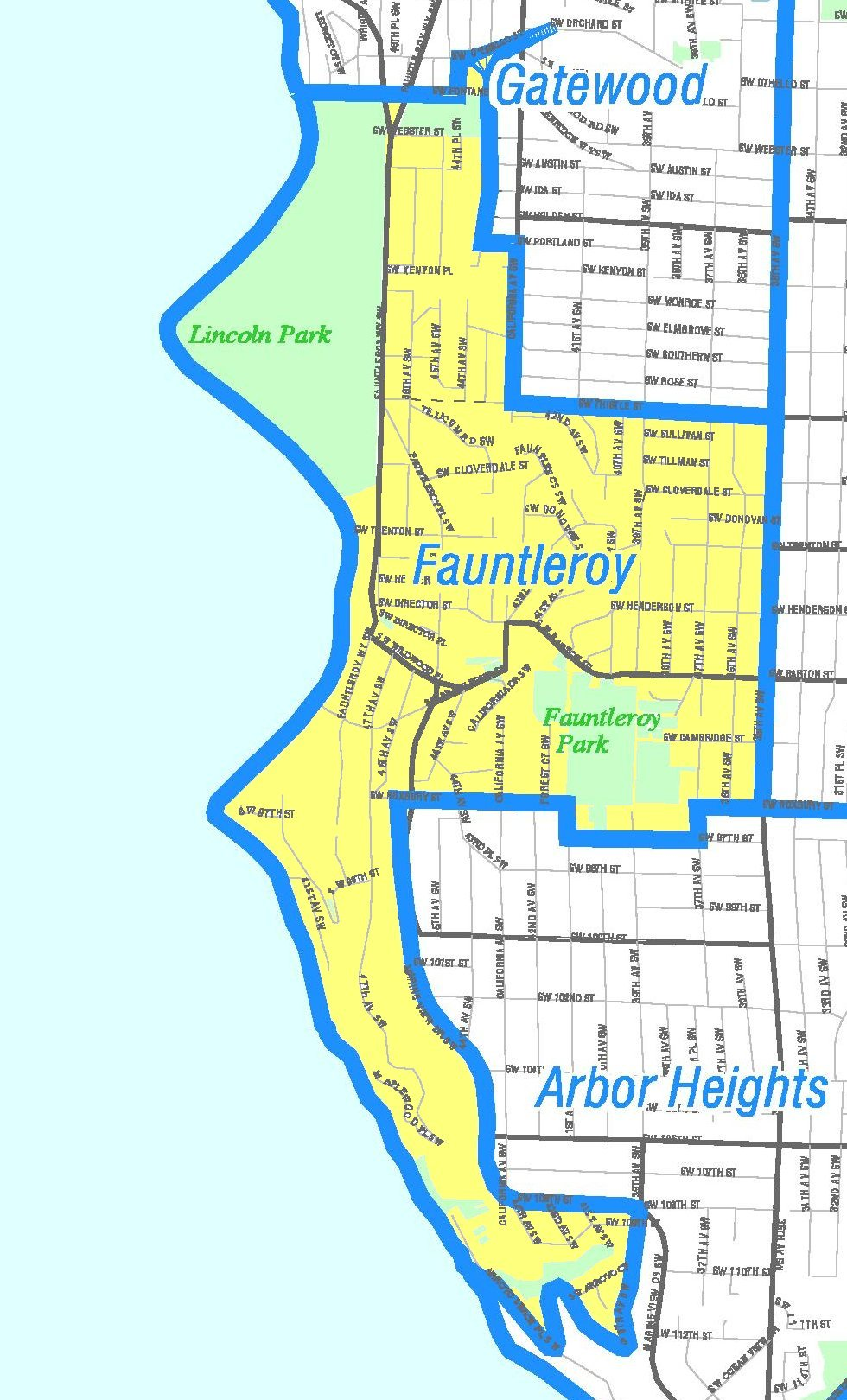
- Fauntleroy Highlighted in Yellow
- Coordinates: 47°31′29″N 122°23′06″W
- Country: United States
- State: Washington
- County: King
- City: Seattle
- Time zone: UTC−8 (PST)
  - Summer (DST): UTC−7 (PDT)
- ZIP Code: 98136
- Area code(s): 206, 564

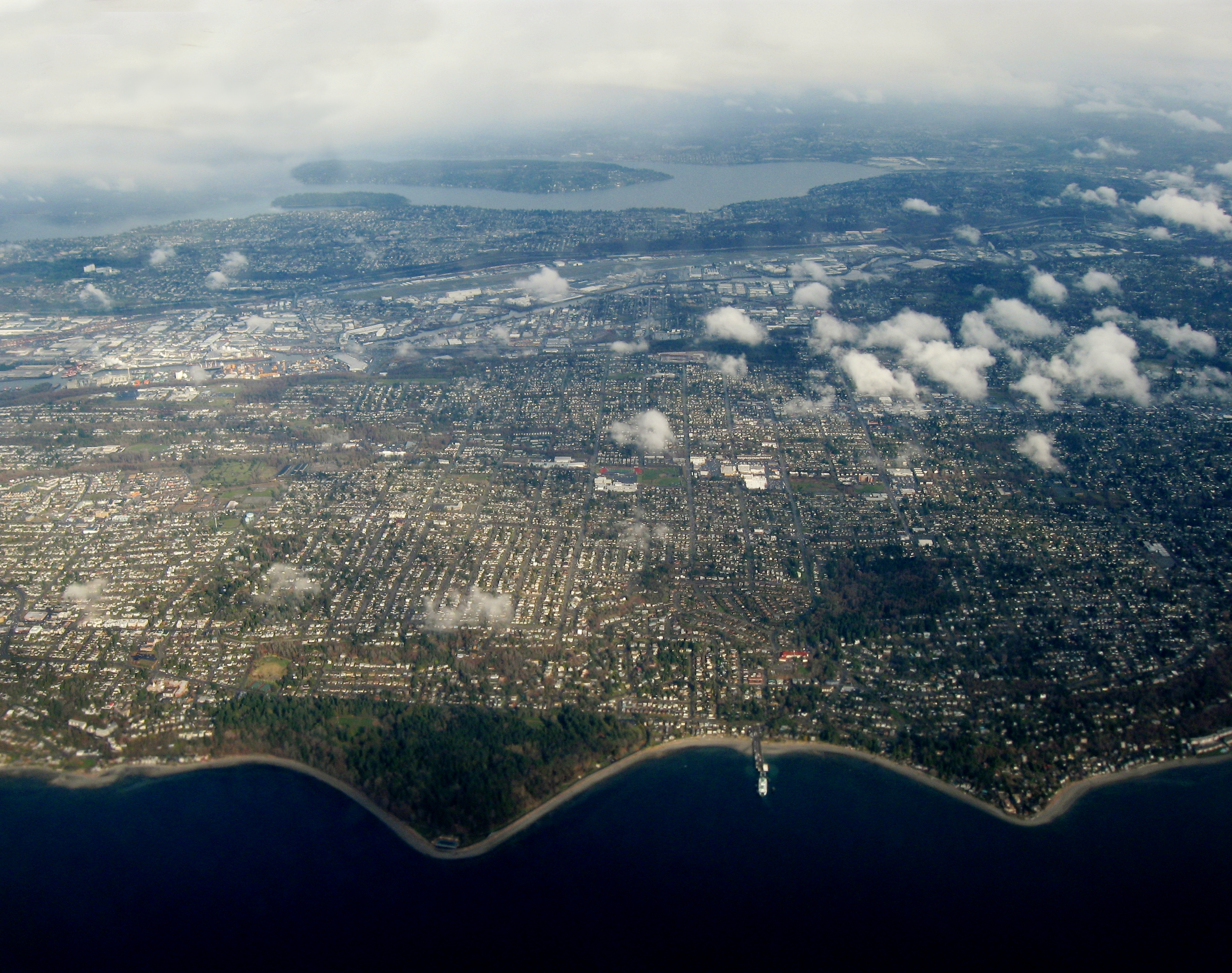
Aerial view of Fauntleroy, looking east towards Lake Washington. The forested point in the foreground is Lincoln Park. Fauntleroy Park can be seen slightly above that and to the right

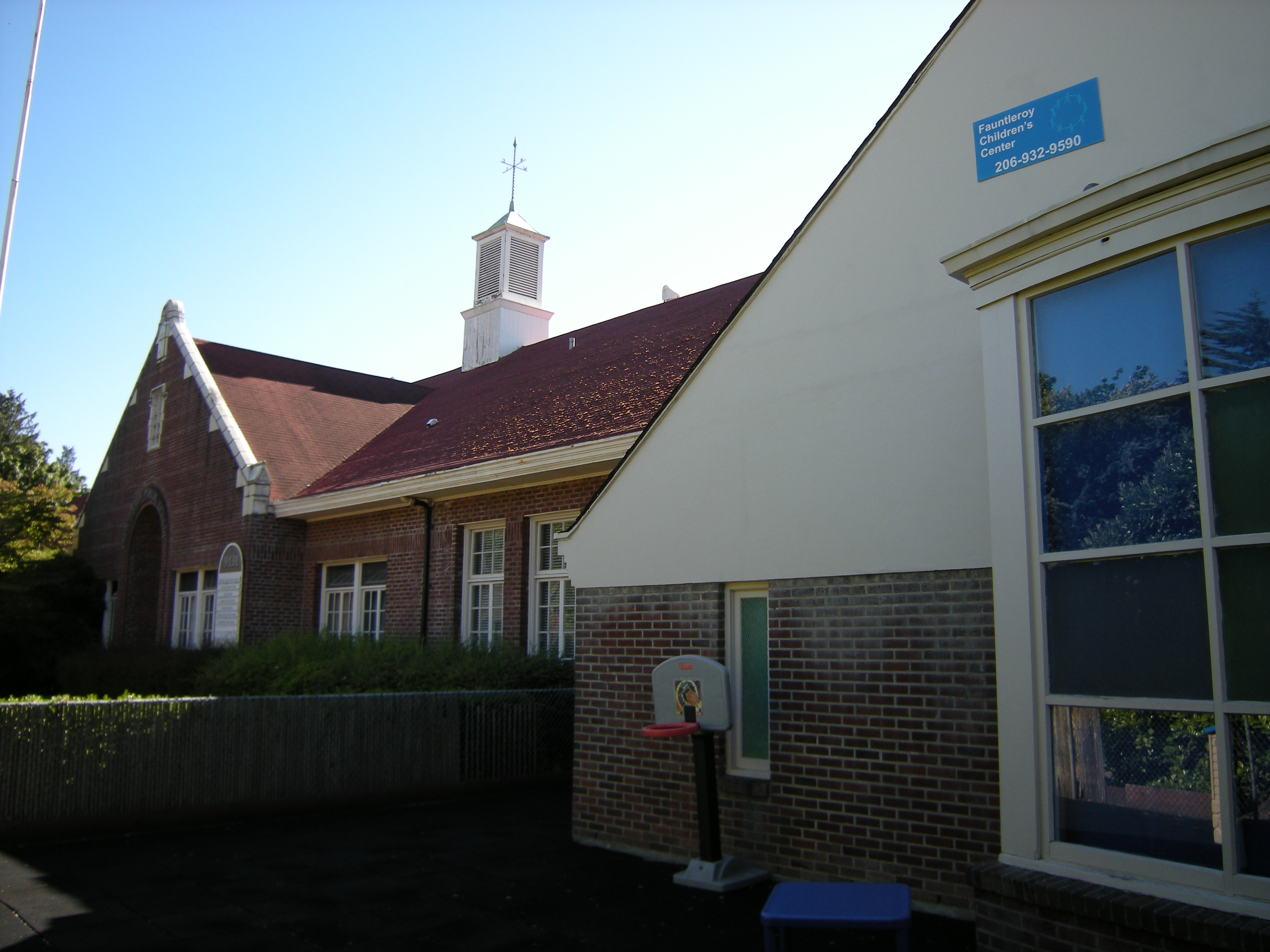
The former Fauntleroy Public School (2008)

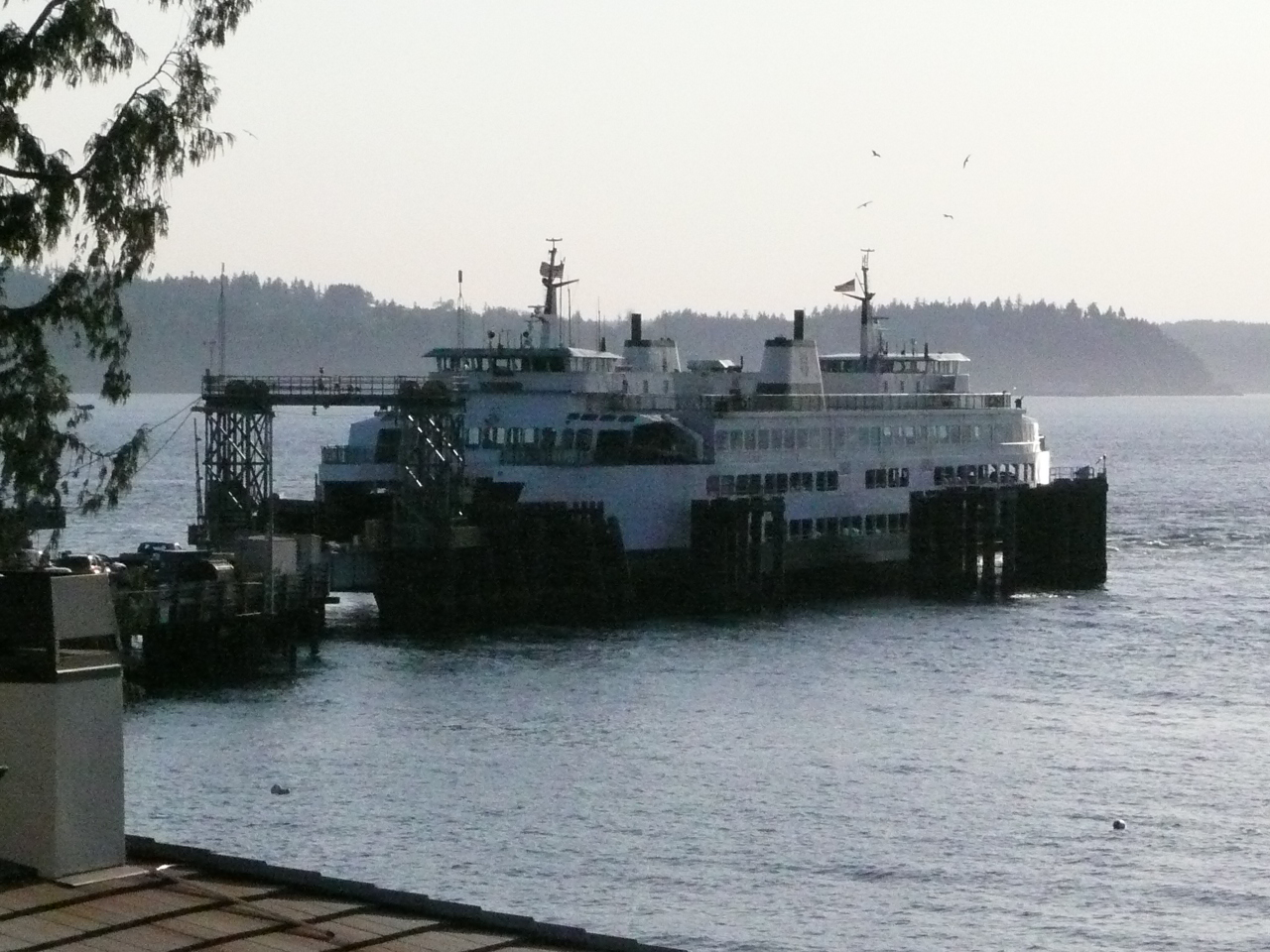
Fauntleroy Ferry Terminal as seen from Fauntleroy Way SW

Fauntleroy is a neighborhood in the southwest corner of Seattle, Washington. Part of West Seattle and situated on Puget Sound's Fauntleroy Cove (into which Fauntleroy Creek flows from its source in Fauntleroy Park), it faces Vashon Island, Blake Island, and the Kitsap Peninsula to the west. On sunny days, many locations in the neighborhood offer views of the Olympic Mountains, which are about 40 miles (64 km) to the west. The neighborhood adjoins Lincoln Park to the north, Fauntlee Hills to the east, and Arbor Heights to the south. Within Fauntleroy is an area known as Endolyne (the "end of the line" of the Fauntleroy Park streetcar route in the early 1900s). Fauntleroy is home to an eponymous Washington State Ferries terminal, providing service to Vashon Island and Southworth.

Fauntleroy Way runs into the West Seattle Bridge, which runs across the Duwamish Waterway (Duwamish River).

== History ==
The neighborhood, creek, and park all take their name from the cove, itself named by one Lt. George Davidson of the U. S. Coast Survey in 1857 in honor of the family of his fiancée, Ellinor Fauntleroy of Indiana. The development of Fauntleroy began in 1905.

Fauntleroy's history was chronicled by Roy Morse and Richard Brown in Fauntleroy Legacy (1989) and by Clay Eals in West Side Story (West Seattle Herald, 1987).

== Community ==
Central to the Fauntleroy neighborhood are Fauntleroy Church (United Church of Christ), Fauntleroy YMCA, and The Hall at Fauntleroy (the closed Fauntleroy School), which now houses Fauntleroy Children's Center (childcare); a caterer, rental auditorium and meeting rooms; and several other business tenants.

An all-volunteer, Community organization (Fauntleroy Community Association) founded in the early 1980s brings neighbors together to address local issues such as Environmental quality, Traffic and Parking.
