= John Garland (cricketer) =

Australian cricketer

Personal information
- Born: 22 August 1875; Melbourne, Australia
- Died: 23 February 1938 (aged 62); Melbourne, Australia

Domestic team information
- Years: Team
- 1904: Victoria
- Source: Cricinfo, 15 November 2015

John Garland (22 August 1875 – 23 February 1938) was an Australian cricketer. He played one first-class cricket match for Victoria in 1904.

== See also ==
- List of Victoria first-class cricketers
