= Jack Garland =

Jack Garland may refer to:

- Jack Garland (Australian politician) (1922–1993), member of the New South Wales Legislative Council
- Jack Garland (boxer) (1908–1985), boxer from Northern Ireland
- Jack Garland (Canadian politician) (1918–1964), member of the Canadian House of Commons
- Jack Bee Garland (1869–1936), transgender author, nurse and adventurer

== Other uses ==
- Jack Garland, the player character of the 2022 video game Stranger of Paradise: Final Fantasy Origin
- Jack Garland Airport, named for the Canadian politician

== See also ==
- John Garland (disambiguation)
