= Lincoln Park (Seattle) =

Park in Seattle, Washington, United States

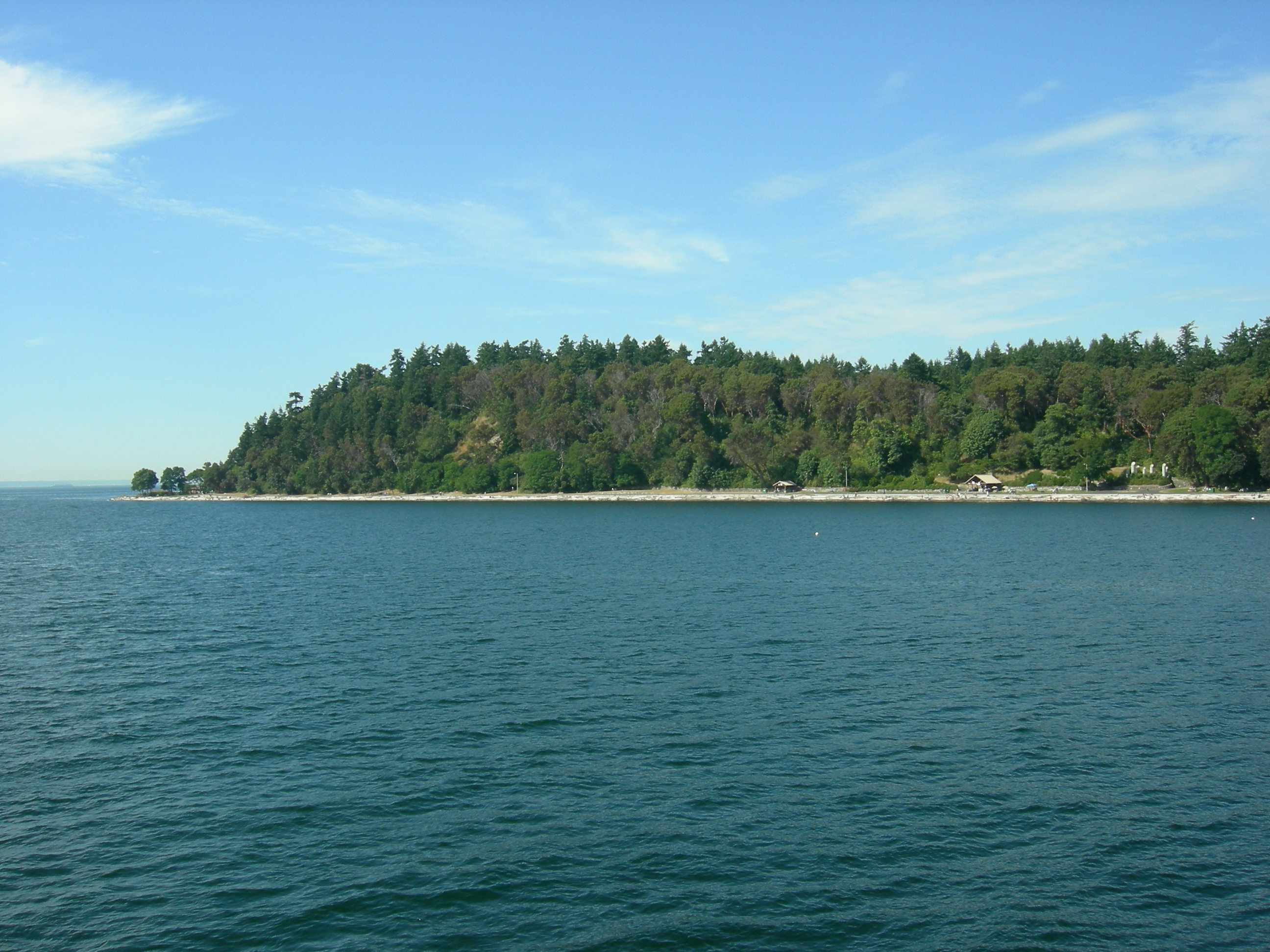
- Lincoln Park, seen from the Fauntleroy-Vashon Ferry
- Interactive map of Lincoln Park
- Type: Urban Park
- Location: Seattle, Washington
- Coordinates: 47°31′49″N 122°23′45″W
- Area: 135 acres (0.55 km^{2})
- Created: 1922; 104 years ago
- Operator: Seattle Parks and Recreation

Lincoln Park is a 135-acre (0.55 km^{2}) park in West Seattle alongside Puget Sound. The park's attractions include forest trails, a paved walkway along the beach, athletic fields, picnic shelters, and a heated saltwater swimming pool which is open during the summer. The park is adjacent to the Fauntleroy neighborhood.

== History ==
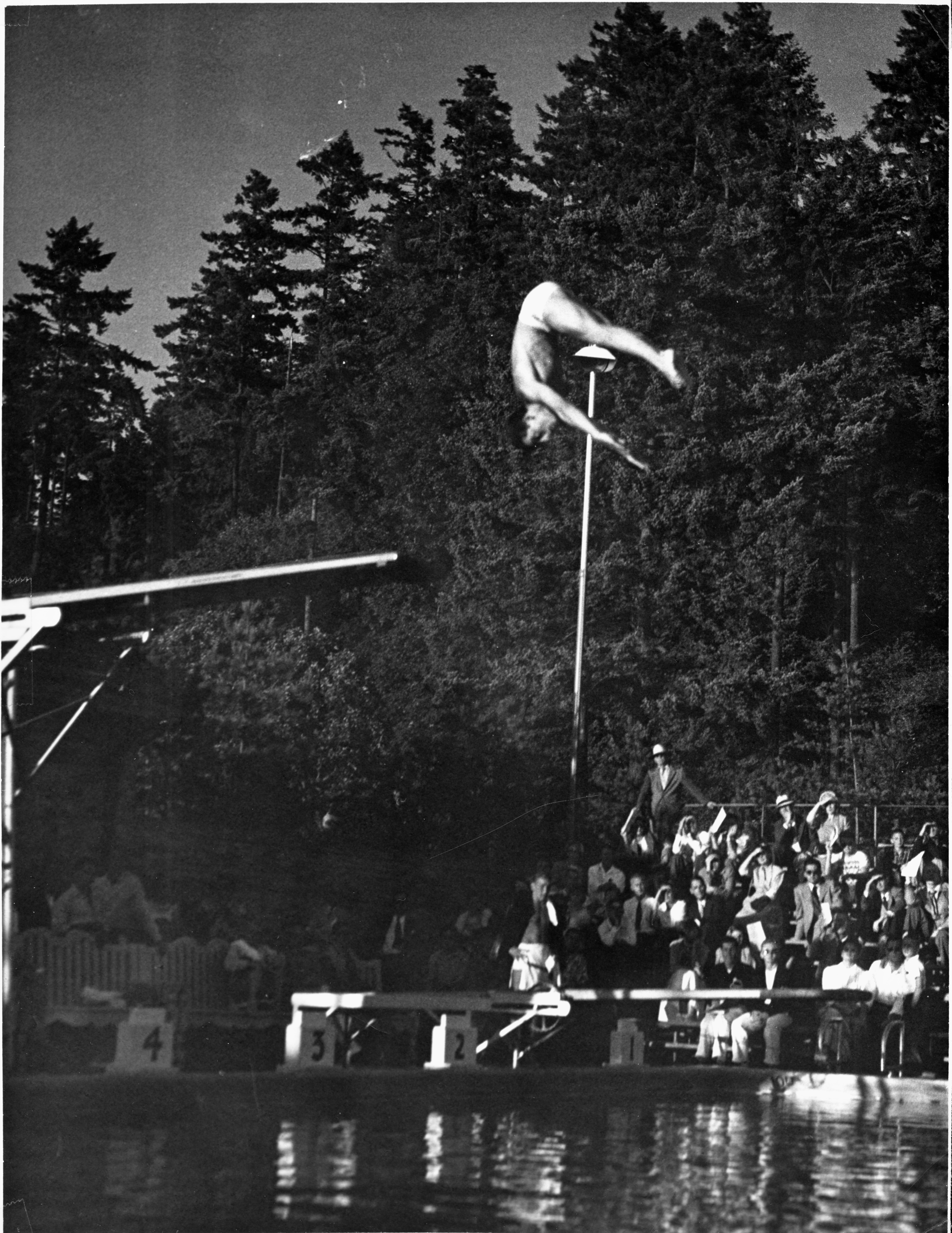
A diver at Lincoln Park's Colman pool in 1950

The park occupies a headland called Williams Point. The Duwamish called the area "Tight Bluff" (Lushootseed: CHuXáydoos), referring to the dense plant growth.

The city of Seattle approved acquisition of the park in 1922 as had been recommended by the Olmsted Brothers Landscape Architecture firm in 1908. The park was called Williams Point Park by the Olmsted Brothers but was named Fauntleroy Park by the city. The park was eventually renamed to honor Abraham Lincoln.

The Olmsted Brothers were never commissioned to develop a plan and the park was developed without any particular design vision.

In 1925 the city of Seattle built a dirt sided swimming pool at Point Williams where there had been a natural lagoon. A wood sluice gate allowed the Lincoln Park Swimming Pool to be filled with salt water at high tide and drained at low tide. The construction of the pool coincided with a convention of the Knights Templar, about 500 of whom camped in the park.

In the 1930s the WPA and other American New Deal agencies built trails, seawalls, playgrounds and tennis courts in the park.

In 1941, Seattle pioneer descendant Kenneth Colman donated Lincoln Park's Colman Pool to the city of Seattle as a memorial to his father Laurence. The saltwater Colman Pool was built over the site of the tide-fed swimming pool that the city had constructed in 1925. The lobby of the pool's building has a mural by Ernest Norling. The pool was integrated in 1944 after demonstrations by African American students from the University of Washington.

In the late 1960s and early 1970s Forward Thrust allocated approximately $900,000 to Lincoln Park for the improvement of its facilities. Among the projects were tennis courts and washrooms.

In 1985 and again in 1988 the Army Corps of Engineers oversaw projects to stabilize the 1930s era seawall and protect Colman Pool and other structures at Williams Point. For the 1988 project, approximately 40,000 tons of rocks were deposited along the seawall and around Williams Point. A follow on study by the United States Fish and Wildlife Service found that the projects had a detrimental effect on the intertidal ecosystem.

In 2023, a 15-foot (4.6 m) sculpture of a troll, named Bruun Idun, was built in Lincoln Park by Danish artist Thomas Dambo as part of the Northwest Trolls: Way of the Bird King project. A proposal to add a set of six pickleball courts to the park was rejected in 2024 after public outcry from local residents and conservationists, particularly birders.

== Topography ==
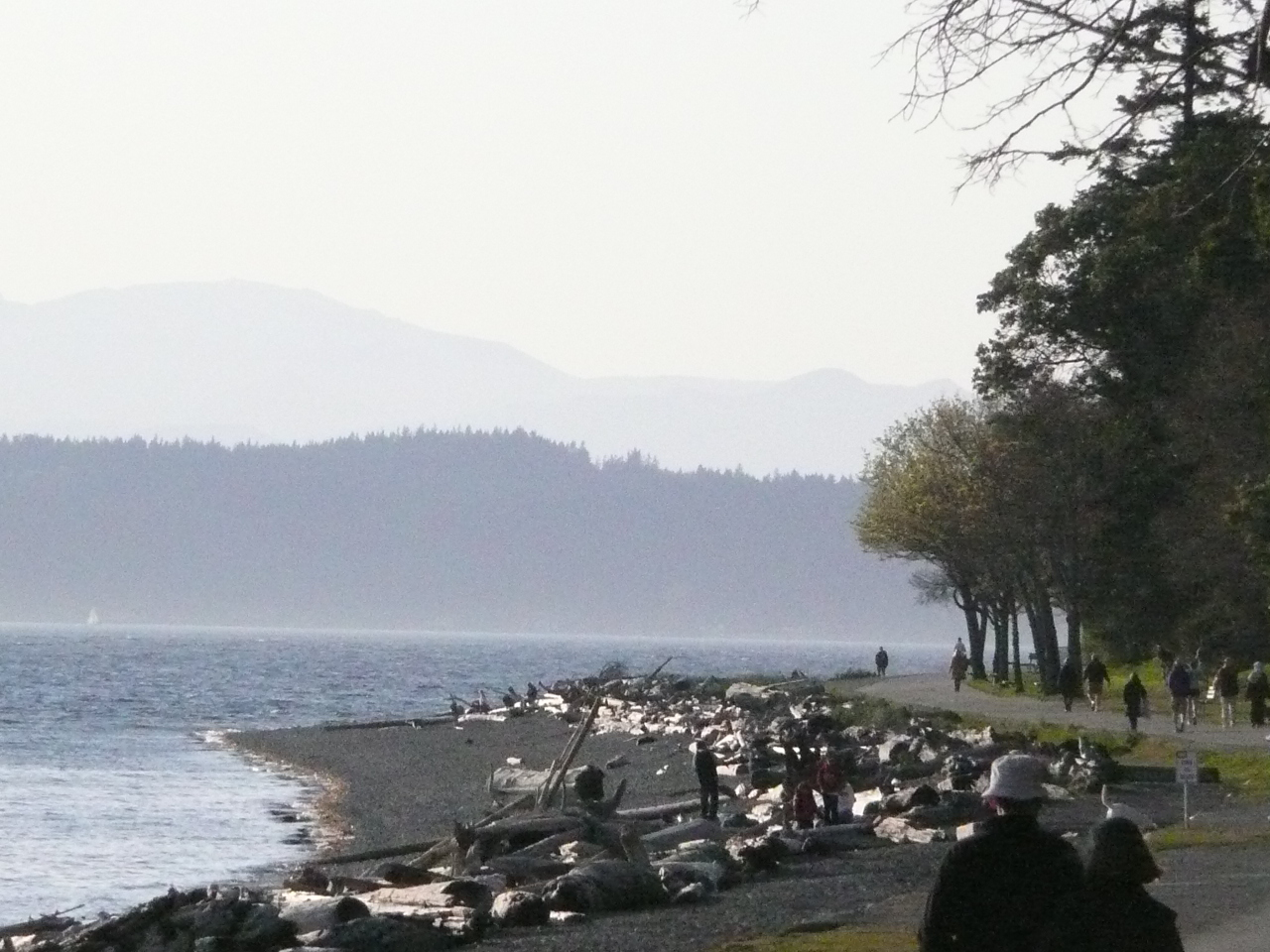
Lincoln Park waterfront walk and beach

Lincoln Park is composed of approximately 64% forested natural area, 16% developed landscape area, 12% shoreline and 8% recreation space (playground, ball fields, etc.). The upland area includes open and forested portions, and is bordered to the west by a steep bluff that drops approximately 100 feet to the saltwater shoreline below. Vegetation includes open lawn with trees, intact and invaded native forest, madrona groves, beach grass, and landscape beds.

Per user-identified sightings logged on eBird, more than 150 species of birds have been observed in and around the park. Between 2017 and 2020 the Seattle chapter of the Audubon Society documented 61 species of birds in the park.

Lincoln Park hosts a variety of tree species. A grove of rare Dawn Redwoods was planted in the park in 2014.

A 2010 study found Lincoln Park's shoreline habitat to be one of the ecologically healthiest in Seattle.
