= Edward Garland (cricketer) =

English cricketer

Personal information
- Full name: Edward Garland
- Born: c. 1826; Kennington, Surrey, England
- Died: 4 September 1882 (aged 55/56); Kennington, Surrey, England

Domestic team information
- Years: Team
- 1846: Surrey

Career statistics
Competition	First-class
Matches	2
Runs scored	6
Batting average	2.00
100s/50s	0/0
Top score	3
Catches/stumpings	1/–
- Source: Cricinfo, 7 April 2013

Edward Garland (c. 1826 – 4 September 1882) was an English cricketer. Garland's batting style is unknown. He was born at Kennington, Surrey.

Garland made a single first-class appearance for Surrey against Kent at The Oval in 1846. His second appearance in first-class cricket came in 1853 for the Surrey Club against the Marylebone Cricket Club at The Oval. In his two first-class matches, Garland scored a total of 6 runs from three innings, with a high score of 3.

He died at the place of his birth on 4 September 1882.
