= James F. Garland =

American politician

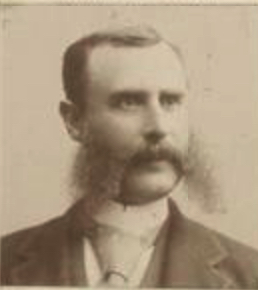

Member of the Virginia House of Delegates for Lancaster and Richmond
- In office December 4, 1889 – December 6, 1893
- Preceded by: E. S. Phillips
- Succeeded by: Howard Hathaway

Personal details
- Born: James Fauntleroy Garland; July 10, 1850 Warsaw, Virginia, U.S.
- Died: October 4, 1915 (aged 65) Warsaw, Virginia, U.S.
- Party: Democratic
- Spouse: Lavicie Webb

James Fauntleroy Garland (July 10, 1850 – October 4, 1915) was an American politician who served in the Virginia House of Delegates.
