= Balland =

Balland is a French surname. Notable people with the surname include:

- Antoine Balland (1751–1821), French general
- Hervé Balland (born 1964), French cross-country skier
- Jean Marie Balland (1934–1998), French Roman Catholic archbishop and cardinal
