= Wedekind =

Wedekind may refer to the following persons:

- Claus Wedekind, a biological researcher
- Frank Wedekind (1864–1918), a German playwright
- Georg Wilhelm von Wedekind (1796–1856), German forester
- Hermann Wedekind (1910–1998), an artistic director
- Luther Lochman von Wedekind (1864–1935), a medical officer in the U.S. Navy on USS Solace (AH-2)
- Rudolf Wedekind (1883–1961), a German paleontologist
