= Karl Walser =

Swiss painter, stage designer, illustrator, muralist and artist

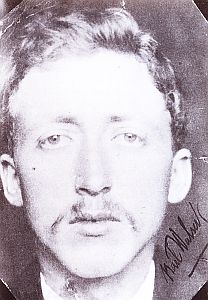
- Walser c.1897
- Born: Karl Edmund Walser; April 8, 1877; Teufen, Switzerland
- Died: September 28, 1943 (aged 66); Bern, Switzerland
- Resting place: Schosshalden Cemetery, Bern, Switzerland
- Spouse: Hedwig Agnes Czarnetzki Walser (m. 1910)

Karl Edmund Walser (April 8, 1877, Teufen - September 28, 1943, Bern) was a Swiss painter, stage designer, illustrator, muralist, and artist. He was the older brother, by one year, of the writer Robert Walser, and provided illustrations or cover art for 11 of Robert's books, including his first book Fritz Kocher's Aufsätze (1904). He was a close friend of German expressionist painter Max Beckmann, who strongly influenced his work.

== Personal life ==
Karl Walser was born in Teufen, on April 8, 1877, to Adolf Walser and Elisa Marti Walser, who were shopowners and sold items including costume jewelry and toys, and who were part of a growing middle class. They had 8 children including Karl. He grew up in Biel.

In Berlin, Karl became friends with theater stars he worked with, including Gertrud Eysoldt and Tilly Durieux. Susan Bernofsky describes his social and professional life as easy and successful, writing “doors opened magically everywhere he went, women swooned, and the professional elite hastened to welcome him. [He could] sail through a crowded room […], distributing friendly nods, warmly pressing the right hands and never the wrong ones. […] He moved through the streets of Berlin like a charmed prince, never faltering or stalled by self-doubt.” Around 1905, he advised his brother Robert on fashionable clothing and on how to succeed in the art world in Berlin, which may have become grating for Robert, who implied in a letter than the fine clothing was (at least for him) dishonest.

In 1910 he married Hedwig Agnes Czarnetzki Walser (1885-1987), a bookkeeper and seamstress.

He died in Bern, on September 28, 1943. He was buried at the Schosshalden Cemetery in Bern.

== Art career ==
He completed an apprenticeship as a decorative artist in Strasbourg and Stuttgart. Most of Walser's earlier works were lost during World War II.

Between 1899 and 1914 he lived in Berlin and became a board member of the Berlin Secession (1903) and later a member of the Deutsche Künstlerbund (German Artists’ Association). Walser was a noted designer and producer stage sets for opera and theatre from 1903 onward. His work was often praised in reviews of the productions and in reviews of collected art volumes, including praise by Hermann Hesse.

While in Berlin, he worked for a top theater director, Max Reinhardt, and designed most of Bruno Cassirer's book covers, including books by Flaubert, Gorky, and Wedekind. Reviews for his work with Reinhardt were rapturous. His work was featured in the journals Das Theater, Kunst und Künstler , and Die Neue Rundschau. He also received commissions for book cover designs and book illustrations. Between 1904 and 1925, Karl illustrated five of his brother Robert Walser's books and designed covers for six others. Correspondence records with the publisher show that (Karl) Walser contributed comprehensively to the design work including paper choice, format, typeface, calligraphy, and the arrangement of illustrations in the text.

Walser took several study trips to Belgium, France, Spain, Italy and Japan. Around 1908, publisher Bruno Cassirer sent Karl on a trip to Japan via Moscow on the Trans-Siberian Railway because Karl had recently experienced the suicide of a former girlfriend. Several of Walser's depictions of Japan are preserved. (See Gallery below.)

He moved residence back to Switzerland from Germany in 1917 and mainly worked on the painterly decoration of public spaces, such as the Amtshaus in Zurich, the Stadttheater in Bern and the Grossratssaal at Bern City Hall. He also completed murals for public buildings and private residences of renowned figures.

In 1942, the Bern council chose Walser's design for a commissioned mural for a new wing at the town hall. The federal president and mayoral figures attended the inauguration. Karl finished the project on a notably short timeline. An article in the Swiss Building Journal that praised his work wrote that the commissioners should have given the artist more time. Walser was in poor health and the project is thought to have hastened his death.

== Reception ==
An article in Ruhrorter Zeitung in 1904 wrote about Walser's design for the play Silent Hours by the Danish playwright Soen Lange:

"Karl Walser had done the best job, wrapping the play in the delightful framework of quiet rooms, which are so absolutely necessary in the milieu of this work. He had created wonderfully old-fashioned rooms, with old pictures in black frames, large-patterned sofas, and spotless curtains. An atmosphere of close, quietly guarded happiness. And even the father's poor, cramped room had something touchingly shaky, decaying about it, like the old man's fate itself. Thus, the mood of the play rose from the rooms and mingled with the people to create a powerful, unified effect."

— excerpt from an article about Walser's production design, 1904

A review of the 1908 "Exhibition of Modern Masters" in Halle was reported on by The Saale-Zeitung (February 17, 1908):

"Walser's paintings are romantic and stylized. [...] 'The Hermit,' is among the best paintings in the exhibition and is also distinguished by its color composition. The painting 'Garden' is also magnificent, [...]. A snapshot from the time of pastoral plays, when love danced on high heels. The 'Dancer' symbolizes the essence of our variety shows. [...]. "The Walk" demonstrates Walser's talent for illustration and his subtle humor. [...]Scrubby fir trees stand in front, and silence hangs over the forest."

— excerpt from a 1908 review of Walser's works in an exhibition

A book critic at the Hannoversche Kurier wrote in 1906 about one of the Robert and Karl collaboration books:

"I also love the book because it contains the wonderful drawings by Karl Walser. These 11 drawings are among the most beautiful I know by the artist. What a final simplification of lines and what a poetic brilliance! Robert Walser’s poetic style and his brother’s drawn style are closely related: in both, the same, one might say, mythical simplicity prevails. How a young painter walking through the rain, or a young, sick poet sitting by the window gazing sadly at the fir trees, or a schoolroom with children is depicted here—you have to see it to fully appreciate the charm of Walser’s linework."

In 1912 Bruno Cassirer published a book Das Theater which collected many of Walser's stage designs and costumes. Hermann Hesse, who hadn't seen any of the related theater productions in person, wrote about the book:

: "I am a doubly unbiased connoisseur of this book [because I've never seen the original work in Berlin]. [...] Softly and fluidly drawn, carefully studied and executed in all essential aspects, almost never theatrical in their movements, but always full of grace and humor, and incredibly fresh in color. [...] For me, this is Walserian theater, defined by its relationships and completely detached from foundations, I simply see and enjoy it as a delightful piece of delicately cultivated art, a delicious play of colored shadows."

— from Hermann Hesse's review of a collected volume of Karl Walser's art works, 1913

== Re-prints and publications ==
- Walser's series of illustration's for his brother Robert Walser's set of school essays by a fictional child, "Fritz Kocher's Essays", originally published in 1904, are re-printed in the 2013 English translation collection A Schoolboy's Diary.
- Several of Karl Walser illustrations are published on the New York Review's online story pages for the Robert Walser collection Girlfriends, Ghosts, and Other Stories (2016).

=== Cover Art ===
- Walser's painting of Robert dressed as a Schiller character was used for the 2000 English language release of The Robber published by the University of Nebraska Press.
- His illustrations were also used for the cover art several modern English-language publications of Robert's work, including the New York Review Books versions of Jakob von Gunten, A Schoolboy's Diary, and Girlfriends, Ghosts, and Other Stories.

== Gallery ==
=== Selected works ===
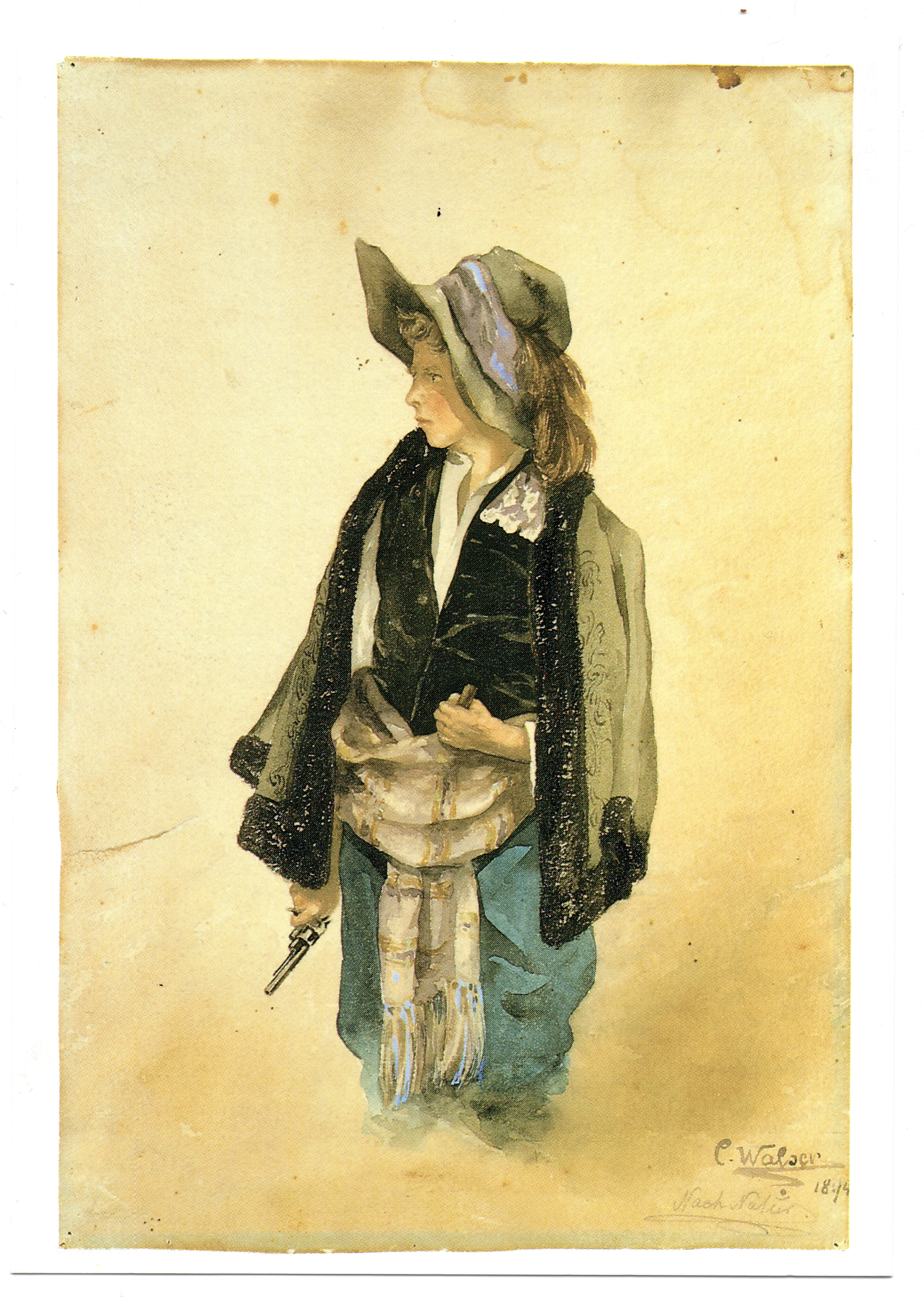
The Robber (Robert Walser in costume for a play)

The Hermit (1907)

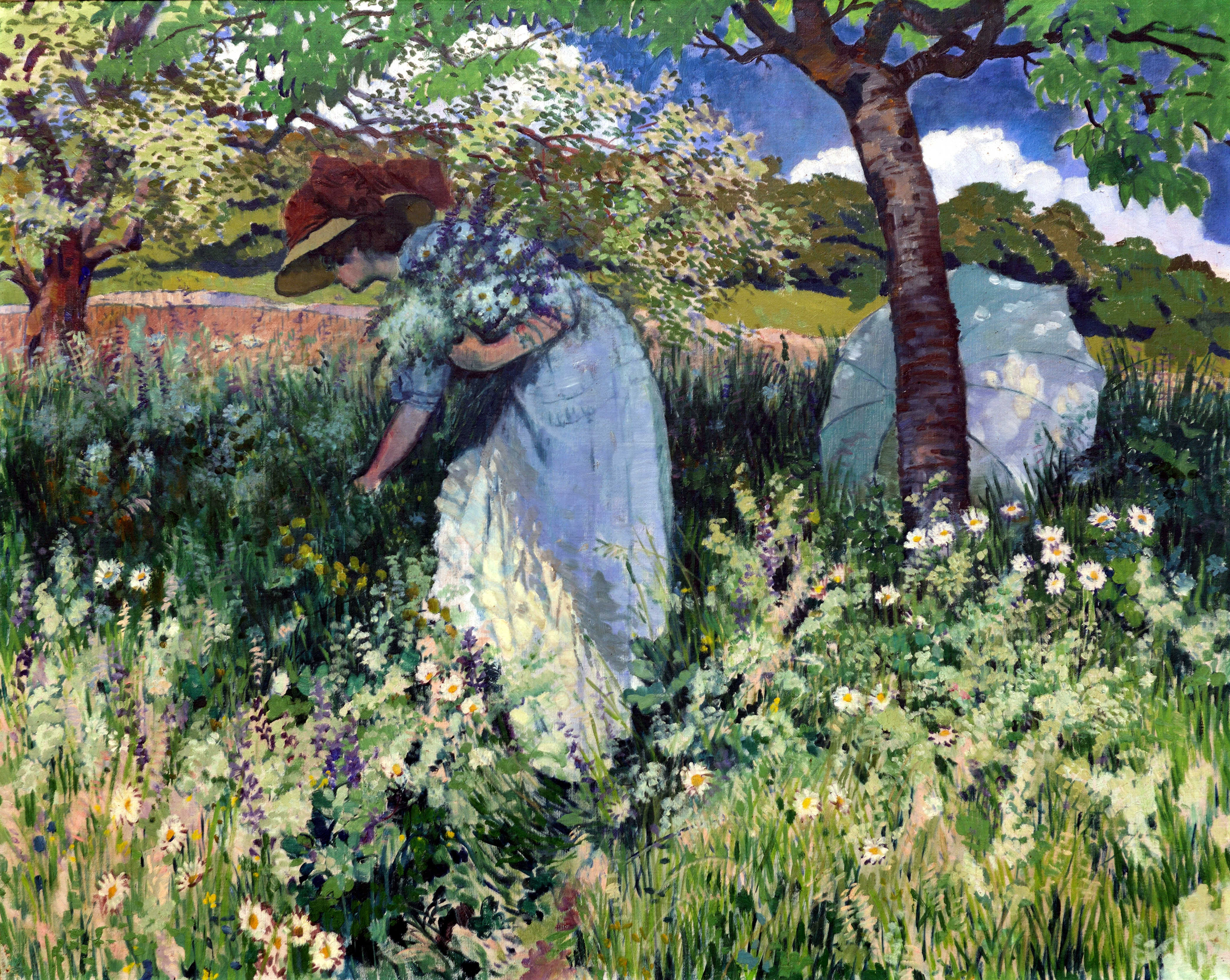
Frau auf Blumenwiese (1910)

Young woman, leaning against a balcony (1910)

Portrait of a Lady (Damenbildnis)

Zwei Mädchen und Verhüllte (1911)

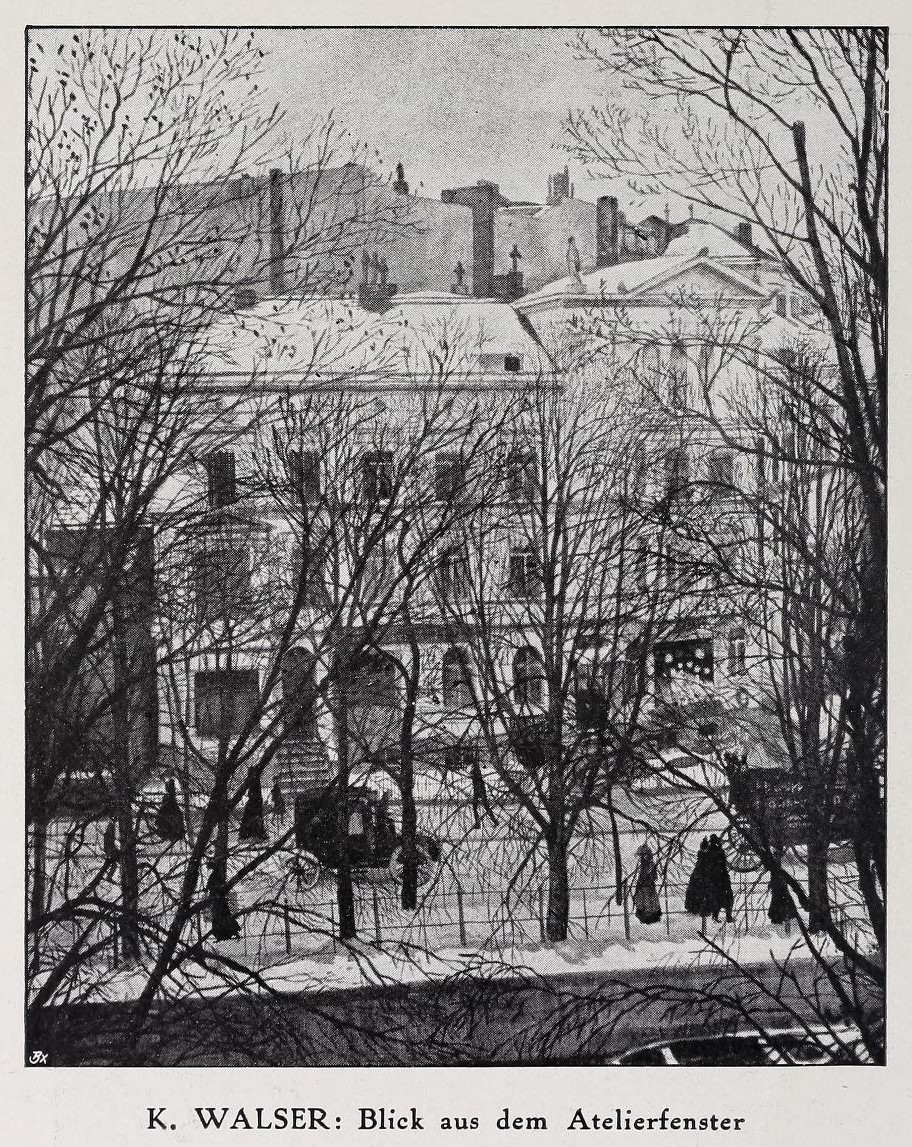
Blick aus dem Atelierfenster (1908)

Zwölf-Apostel-Kirche Berlin (1914)

Scheherezade erzählend (1907)

=== Etchings ===
==== From Fritz Kocher's Essays ====
These etchings and illustrations were published in Robert Walser's book Fritz Kocher's Essays in 1904.

The Classroom

The Poet

Fire

The Clerks (German Der Kommis) (Note: "Commis" or "Kommis" is a French word for clerks)

The Forest

The Fair

The Countess

From the Imagination

Fritz Kocher's Grave

==== Other ====
Snow (1904)

For Robert Walser's book Poems (1908-1909)

Illustration for Seeland

=== Stage designs ===
Stage design for Romeo and Juliet in Berlin (1906)

Preliminary sketch for the stage design of Griselda - Act 1, Scene 2, Galleria (1909)

Tempelchen mit Treppe in Park (Stage set design)

=== Covers and illustrations for books ===
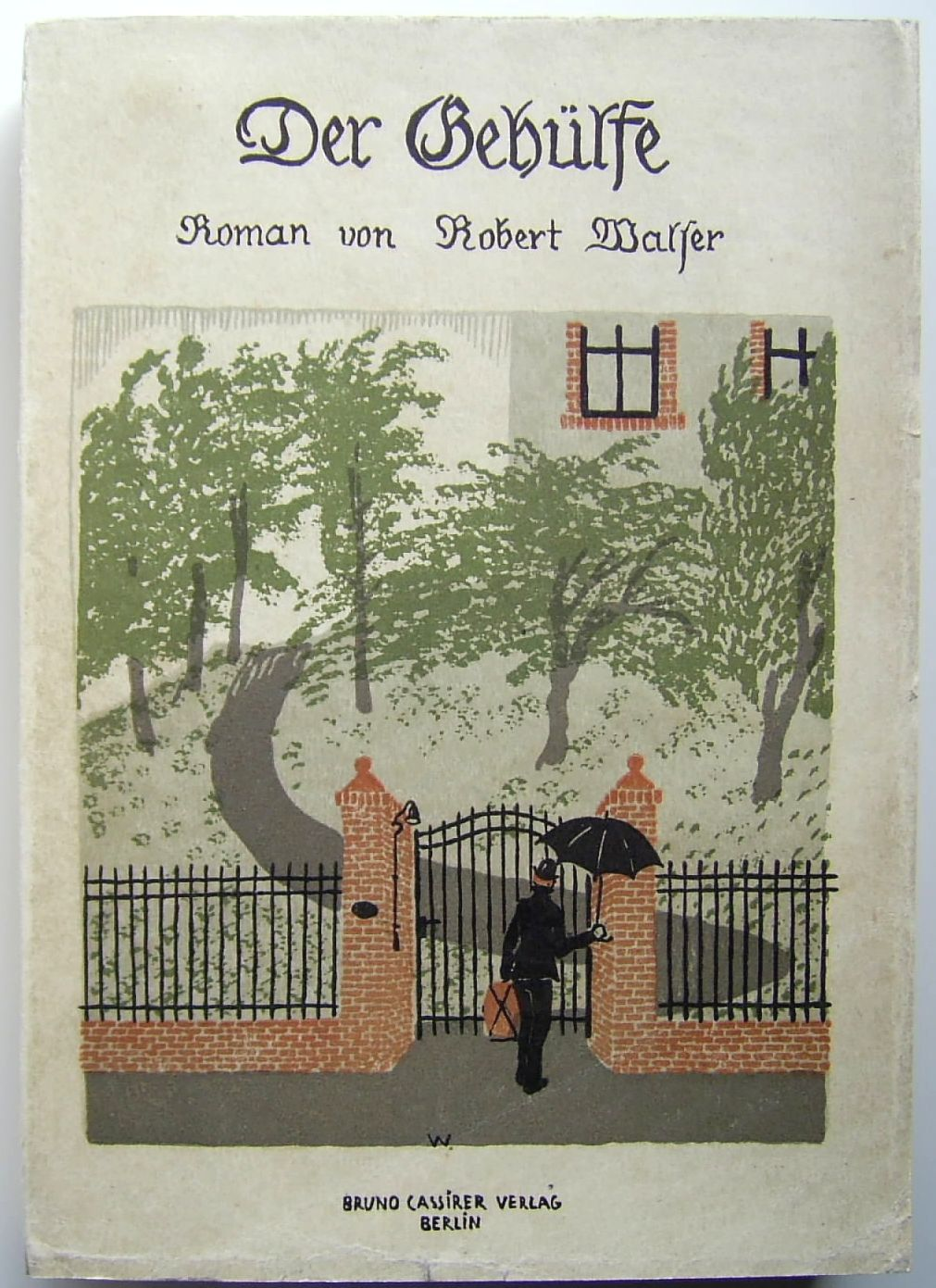
Cover art for Robert Walser's novel The Assistant (1909)

Covert for Robert Walser's Aufsatze (Essays) (1909)

Cover for Robert Walser's novel Geschwister Tanner in 1907 (known in English as The Tanners)

Cover for Georg Büchner's Leonce and Lena edition in 1910

Cover for Eduard von Keyserling's Harmonie (1914)
