= USS Solace (AH-2) =

United States Navy hospital ship

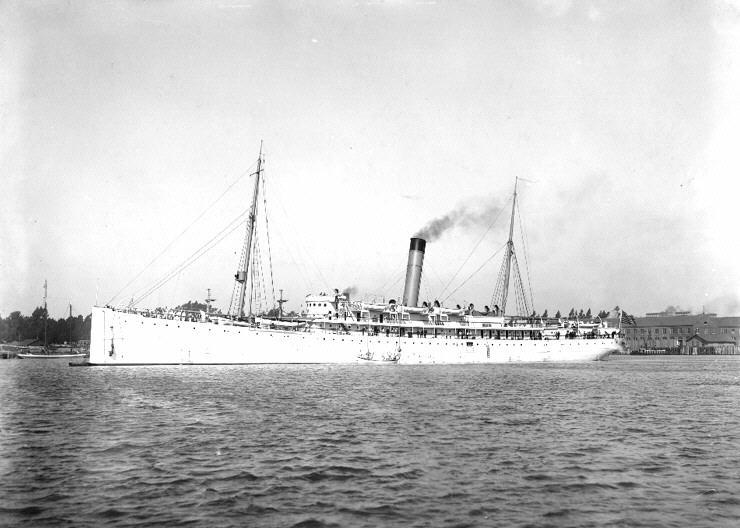
- Off the Mare Island Navy Yard, 1 July 1899.

History

United States
- Name: USS Solace
- Builder: Newport News Shipbuilding & Drydock Co., Newport News, Virginia
- Launched: 8 August 1896
- Acquired: 7 April 1898
- Commissioned: 14 April 1898
- Decommissioned: 12 October 1905
- Recommissioned: 3 June 1908
- Decommissioned: 14 April 1909
- Recommissioned: 20 November 1909
- Decommissioned: 20 July 1921
- Stricken: 6 August 1930
- Fate: Sold for scrap, 6 November 1930

General characteristics
- Type: Hospital ship
- Displacement: 5,700 long tons (5,791 t)
- Length: 377 ft (115 m)
- Beam: 44 ft (13 m)
- Draft: 22 ft (6.7 m)
- Speed: 15 knots (28 km/h; 17 mph)
- Complement: 270
- Armament: None

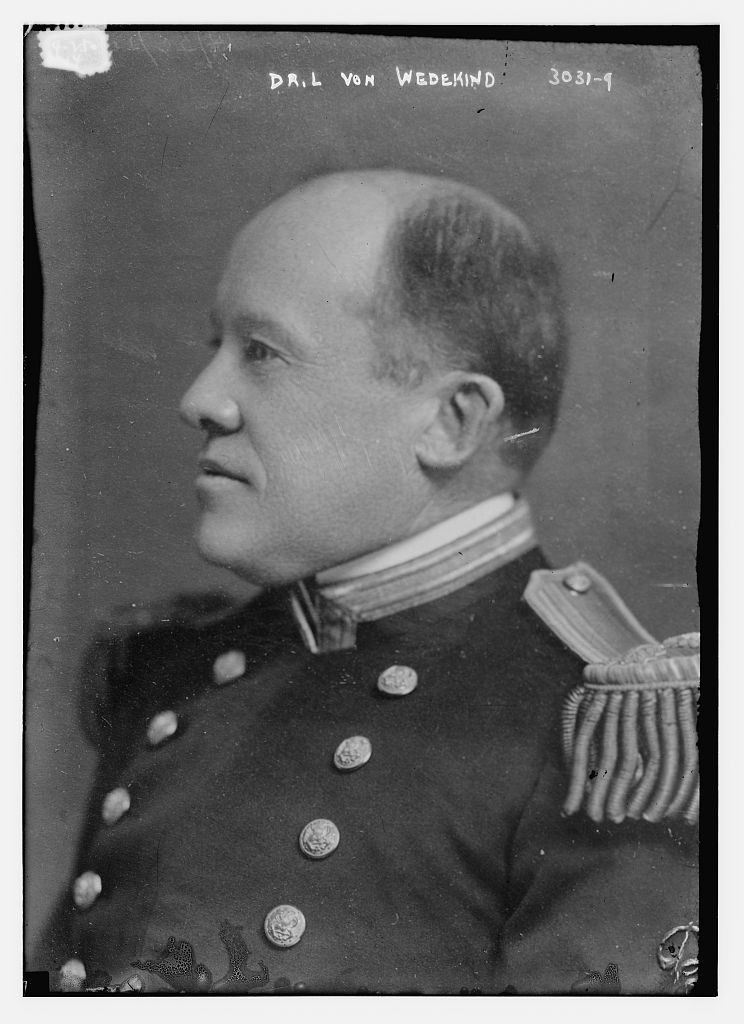
Commander Luther Lochman von Wedekind

USS Solace (AH-2) was a hospital ship in the United States Navy. Solace was built in 1896 and 1897 by the Newport News Shipbuilding & Drydock Co., Newport News, Virginia, and was operated as the SS Creole by the Cromwell Steamship Lines. The ship was acquired by the United States Navy on 7 April 1898, renamed Solace, and converted into a hospital ship. She was the first Navy ship to fly the Geneva Red Cross flag. Solace was commissioned on 14 April 1898.

== Service history ==
=== 1898–1905 ===
The hospital ship was in constant service during the Spanish–American War, returning wounded and ill servicemen from Cuba to Norfolk, New York, and Boston. In February 1899, she sailed for Europe, and she visited ports there, in the Near East, the Far East, and Hawaii, before arriving at Mare Island, California, on 27 May, for an overhaul. She returned to sea on 1 July 1899 and, until October 1905, carried mail, passengers, and provisions from San Francisco to Hawaii, Guam, the Philippine Islands, China, and Japan. Solace was placed out of commission at the Mare Island Navy Yard on 12 October 1905.

=== 1908–1909 ===
Recommissioned on 3 June 1908, Solace voyaged to the Fiji Islands; Samoa; and Magdalena Bay, Mexico, before transiting the Panama Canal, calling at Caribbean ports, and steaming to Charleston, South Carolina, Solace was decommissioned there on 14 April 1909.

=== 1909–1921 ===
Recommissioned again on 20 November 1909, Solace joined the Atlantic Fleet on 6 December 1909 and served as a hospital ship at ports along the eastern seaboard of the United States from Newport, Rhode Island, to Key West, Florida. She was under the command of Luther Lochman von Wedekind. On 2 December 1910 she suffered minor damage in a collision with a barge near the Brooklyn Bridge, New York City. She also operated at Guantanamo Bay, Cuba; in the Panama Canal Zone; and at other ports in the Caribbean. This routine was broken in October and November 1913 by a five-week voyage to France.

She was stationed in New York Harbor at the 82nd Street Landing in late December 1918.

On 1 January 1919, Solace was ordered to proceed to the vicinity of USS Northern Pacific, then aground off Fire Island, New York, loaded with wounded veterans returning from France. Solace anchored off Fire Island that night. The next day, heavy seas prevented the transfer of survivors from Northern Pacific to the hospital ship. The seas subsided on the 3rd, and small boats began the transfer. Patients were taken on board all of that day and by the time Solace was ready to return to New York on the 4th, she had a total of 504 patients on board even though her berthing facilities could accommodate only about 200. These were used for the seriously wounded while the remainder were put in cots. Solace returned to Hoboken, New Jersey, that night; and, by 0530 on 5 January, had debarked all of the patients.

=== Decommissioning and sale ===
After her detachment from the Atlantic Fleet on 1 April 1921, Solace was berthed at the Philadelphia Navy Yard. She was decommissioned on 20 July 1921; struck from the Navy List on 6 August 1930; and sold to Boston Metals Co., Baltimore, Maryland, on 6 November for scrap.

== Commanders ==
- Andrew Dunlap, 14 April 1898 through 20 May 1902
- Frederic Singer, 20 May 1902 through ?
- Luther Lochman von Wedekind (1864–1935), circa 1909 through 1914 and possibly beyond
