= A Schoolboy's Diary =

2013 short story collection by Robert Walser translated by Damion Searls

- Cover of the 2013 NYRB Classics edition
- Author: Robert Walser
- Translator: Damion Searls
- Language: English
- Publisher: The New York Review of Books
- Publication date: 2013
- Publication place: United States
- Media type: Print
- Pages: 179
- ISBN: 978-1-59017-672-6

A Schoolboy's Diary is an English-language collection of 50-70 prose pieces by the Swiss author Robert Walser translated by Damion Searls, including illustrations by Karl Walser. The selected pieces span a timeframe from 1899 to 1925, which encompasses most of Walser's writing career. Most of the pieces had not been translated into English before.

== Background ==
The translator, Damion Searls, selected the pieces mostly from Walser's works that had not yet been translated, and used a loose theme of "beginnings and writing (schoolboys and diaries)." "Fritz Kocher's Essays" had already appeared in English, but Searls included it for thematic completeness.

Walser's first prose book, Fritz Kochers Aufsätze in 1904, centered on schoolroom essays written by a fictional child narrator named Fritz Kocher. Ben Lerner at The New Yorker has argued that all of Walser's narrators have a schoolboy-like levity, "an unmistakable combination of insight and (faux?) naivete, poetic license and (mock?) servility."

== Reception ==
Nicholas Lezard wrote in a review at The Guardian, "there is no one like Walser. Utterly original, he expressed thoughts that no other writer would, except when in the blackest of moods – but Walser expressed them in an extraordinarily sunny way." Will Heyward at Music and Literature wrote in a review that A Schoolboy’s Diary confirms the "singular, complicated kind of joy that [Walser] both invented and explored." Heyward wrote that it "animates Walser’s confounding tininess and incorrigible silliness" better than the other Walser books currently available in English. He noted that the book is uneven due to including pieces from all phases of Walser's life.

Y. Greyman at Open Letters Monthly called the pieces poignant and witty, and praised Walser's talent for "investing meaning into the small, the repetitive, the quotidian. [And] it only takes Walser a sentence or two to place in you in his sweet, tragicomical world." Greyman said the only problem is that it's difficult to read the whole book "in one go" and recommended it as a bedside daily browse.

Joe Winkler at Vol. 1 Brooklyn wrote in a review, "for those [...] who know little to nothing about Walser, this collection [...] serves as the perfect introduction [...]. Most of the book consists of micro stories or micro essays, sketches of landscapes and strange little ideas that appear to meander [...] like unfinished ideas for future stories, but they are all manipulative and delightfully ambiguous." Nora Rawn at KGB Bar Lit wrote in a review that "to read Walser is to fall under the enchantment of a particularly open and youthful enthusiasm." She noted that Walser "has a unique gift for stripping away a reader's layer of world weariness to expose forgotten joys and sorrows, and to rejuvenate a sense of awe. But she thought that the pieces in Part II lost the magic of the earlier Fritz Kocher's essays which "ran away [...] with the unchecked receptivity and guileless prejudices of adolescence."

Eric Liebetrau at The Boston Globe wrote that the book "presents a rangy demonstration of Walser’s penchant for apparently serene portraits of quotidian moments that often mask existential quandaries." He said that it's "humming with well-considered ruminations on his surroundings." Ben Lerner at The New Yorker wrote in an essay about the book that Walser's energy can be felt "crackling" in Searls's translations. Lerner observed that it's "woonderfully difficult to read his tone. When is he serious? When is he mocking the will to conform?"

Trevor Berrett at Mooks and Gripes wrote, "these pieces contain pleasantly familiar, though consistently surprising, themes. Kocher’s essays are wandering and filled with clumsy observations, as Walser [explicitly] notes [...]. But there are [...] striking, remarkable insights." Julian Murphy at The Millions praised the "beauty [Walser] locates in the quotidian, [...] the [...] spiritual appreciation he exhibits for nature, [...] self-referentiality, brazen authorial internections, and the familiarity he exhibits with the reader." He added, "it feels like peering into a mind of fantastic imagination."

== Style and themes ==
Writer Joe Winkler notes that Walser's scenario of a young teenage narrator writing on subjects assigned by a teacher results in literary "exercises in restraint and subtle subversion." Winkler gives the following example:

Man should stand above his fellow creature, the animal, in all things. But even a foolish schoolboy can see people acting like irrational animals every day. Drunkenness is as hideous as a picture: why do people indulge in it? It must be because from time to time they feel the need to drown their reason in the dreams that swim in every kind of alcohol.

— "Fritz Kocher's Essays - MAN" by Robert Walser

Will Heyward at Music and Literature has similarly observed that the "distracted, hyperactive voice of the schoolboy expresses the persistent frustration that marks Walser’s prose." He added that "Nature, in Walser’s hands, is a powerfully swirling, anthropomorphic thing." Heyward analyzed that Walser is "forever teasing out and dramatizing in ungainly and absurd monologues, the difficult, inexorable intersections between selfishness and society, productivity and pleasure, hard work and happiness, idleness and invention."

Y. Greyman at Open Letters Monthly wrote of the book, "Walser's style infuses signature melancholy and bittersweet haunting together with comical or even aggravating lines." Greyman noted that the pieces often have an ambiguous dual perspective of "a zen-like praise of intellectual vacuum, and a pointed criticism."

Writer Ben Lerner describes Walser's style in the book as a "strange mix of exuberance and submission, lyrical abandon and self-abnegation." Lerner says it expresses "poetic attunement to those aspects of the world we [...] overlook, and for which writers concerned with heroic exploits often have no time" and celebrates "the monotonous or uniform [and Walser's] fascination with [servant-like] subservience." Lerner cited the following passage as an example of Walser's common break-off interruptions that "explode the fictional frame":

"In the bright, hot midday sun I would stop for a moment to rest under a fir, beech, or oak tree, stretching out in the moss or grass. It is so nice to relax, but that presupposes a preceding strain or effort, just as there is nothing truly good in this world of ours except where something bad has had to have been overcome. But where am I? Am I actually on a hike right now? How is that possible?"

— "[Untitled, Crossed Out]" (1910) by Robert Walser

Lerner argues that "the meaning of Walser's meandering sentences scurry away--right under the nose of the teacher or inquisitor." He also compares Walser's "refusal of ambition" to Herman Melville's fictional character Bartleby, and argues that it has an "acute political significance" in the historical context of the era of World War 1 and the 1920's rise of fascism in Europe.

Nicholas Lezard observed, "something extremely sophisticated is going on, [...] Walser's village-idiocy is a kind of imposture." Lezard also noted that Samuel Beckett was still a child when Walser wrote some of the "astonishingly Beckettian sentences" in the collection.

== Pieces Included ==
The selection includes about 50 prose works, some of which contain multiple sub-titled sections or sub-pieces. The count of pieces is sometimes given as over 70. Note: items below with two years refer to an earler publication in a journal or periodical and then a later publication in book form.

=== PART I - "Fritz Kocher's Essays" (1904) ===
Introduction
Man
Autumn
The Fire
Friendship
Poverty
School
Politeness
Nature
Open Topic From the Imagination
Careers
The Fatherland
My Mountain
Our City
Christmas
Instead of an Essay
The Fair
Music
The Essay
The Classroom

=== PART II ===
- "Greifen Lake" (Note: Greifensee (lake) in Switzerland) (1899)
- "Six Little Stories" (1901; 1914)

1. About a Poet
2. Lute
3. Piano
4., 5. (Untitled)
6. The Beautiful Place)

- "Letter from a Poet to a Gentleman" (1914)
- "The Poet" (1914)
- "The Mountain" (1914)
- "A Curious City" (Note: The first lines are, "Once there was a city. The people there were all puppets. [...] They not only said: Good morning, or: Good night, they meant it too, and with all their hearts.") (1905; 1914)
- "The Island" (Note: The first line is, "Two newlyweds from Berlin went on a trip.") (1914)
- "[Untitled, Crossed Out]" (thought to be 1910)
- "The Heathstone" (1914)
- "Two Little Things" (1914)
- "By the Lake" (1915)
- "The City" (1915)
- "Spring" (1915)
- "A Schoolboy's Diary" (Note: The narrator says that he is a secondary-school student and it is truly time to think about life more seriously, which he does by describing in detail various teachers, authority figures, and fellow students including Fritz Kocher.) (1908; 1914)
- "Hanswurst" (1914)
- "School Visit" (Note: The narrator warmly describes when a person visited a local school and was satisfied by everything he observed about the school, instruction, the teacher, and the children's behavior, somewhat like an inspector. At the end, the narrator reveals that he was the visitor.) (1921)
- "Hat-Chitti" (Note: Explained in the story as "furious anger over a hat", a mean-spirited children's "game" or harassment ritual. Susan Bernofsky explains in her Walser biography that "chitti" is equivalent to "shit fit" in English.) (1915)
- "The Rowboat" (Note: The first line is, "I think I have already described this scene but I want to write it again.") (1914)
- "Ascent by Night" (Note: The narrator travels to a remote home in the mountains at night by train and then by foot. When he finally reaches the house, and the door is opened, and he is recognized with a lantern light in his face, he notes the details with an apparent sublime feeling.) (1914)
- "Adventure on a Train" (1914)
- "Apollo and Diana" (Note: In the story a woman "prudishly" removes a photo of Lucas Cranach the Elder's painting of the same name from Walser's lodging) (1914)
- "A Story" (Note: The story describes ups and downs in a romantic relationship. The two people end up married. The pieces resembles several other short works by Walser that are noted as re-creations or parodies of pulp novels.) (1921)
- "The New Novel" (Note: The narrator describes the feelings of being repeatedly asked by people about how his new novel is coming along, including a publisher who says, "I would ask you to put off visiting my office until you are in a position to lay your new and good novel on my desk.") (1918)
- "The Letter" (Note: The narrator portrays a letter that is an absurdly critical message from a woman rejecting a man's attempted courtship.) (1918)
- "The Italian Novella" (1917)
- "Caseman and Houseman" (Note: The narrator says that a publisher told a writer one day that he go on a trip to Japan:"Pack your suitcase immediately, or your briefcase, or your cosmetics case for all I care, and without deliberating for a long time beforehand set out for Japan. Got it?" In real life, publisher Bruno Cassirer had sent Karl Walser on a trip to Japan to help him forget a recent grievous experience. In the story, "Houseman" appears to represent Robert Walser, and "Caseman" Karl.) (1917)
- "The Idol" (1914)
- "The Cover" (Note: The story involves a novel manuscript labored over by a writer who is affected when someone remarks that "for the time being" the only thing they can praise is the book's cover.) (1920)
- "The Great Talent" (Note: The "great talent" is described in the story as a "total do-nothing" who has difficulty dealing with his would-be benefactors.) (1918)
- "The Wicked Woman" (1917)
- "A Son and His Mother" (1917)
- "Student and Teacher" (1917)
- "A Model Student" (Note: The student in the title is described as "frightfully respectable" and useless at games and jokes, and who is ambitious without being impressive or interesting.) (1925)
- "The Tale of the Four Happy Fellows" (1925, Unpublished)
- "Summer in the Country" (1914)
- "Swift and Sluggish" (1917)
- "From My Youth" (1919)
- "All Right Then" (Note: Includes the lines, "Hey, writer! Jesus! What's wrong with you? Are you insane? What's wrong with me? Nothing at all, nothing at all. Please! And I am not in the least insane. I beg a thousand pardons but may I dare maintain that I am completely fine. I am totally normal and reliable in every respect.") (1917)
- "Reading" (and "The Woman Who Read Gottfried Keller") (1917)
- "A Devil of a Story" (1916)
- "The Soldier" (1914)
- "Something About Soldiers" (1915)
- "In the Military" (1915)
- "The German Language" (Note: The narrator appears to indirectly use the German language as a stand-in for indirect commentary for Germany's fate and world-standing after World War I.) (1919)
- "Morning and Night" (1920)
- "Flowers" (1920)
- "The Little Tree" (1925)
- "The Last Prose Piece" (1919)

=== PART III ===
- "Hans" (1920)
