= Georg Wilhelm von Wedekind =

German forester and writer (1796–1856)

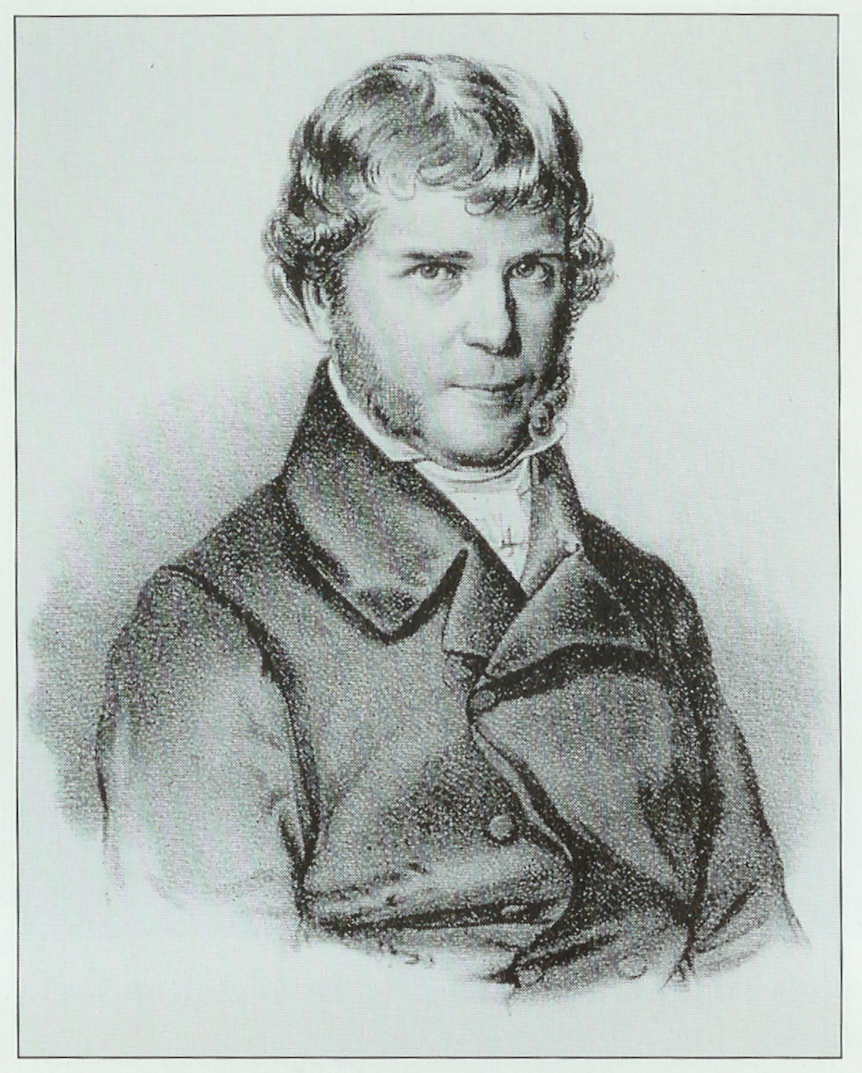
Drawing of Georg Wilhelm von Wedekind in 1840

Georg Wilhelm von Wedekind (28 July 1796 – 22 January 1856) was a German forester and writer. He published several works on the history of forestry and on forest management. He emphasized forestry as a component in the "economy of nature".

== Life and work ==
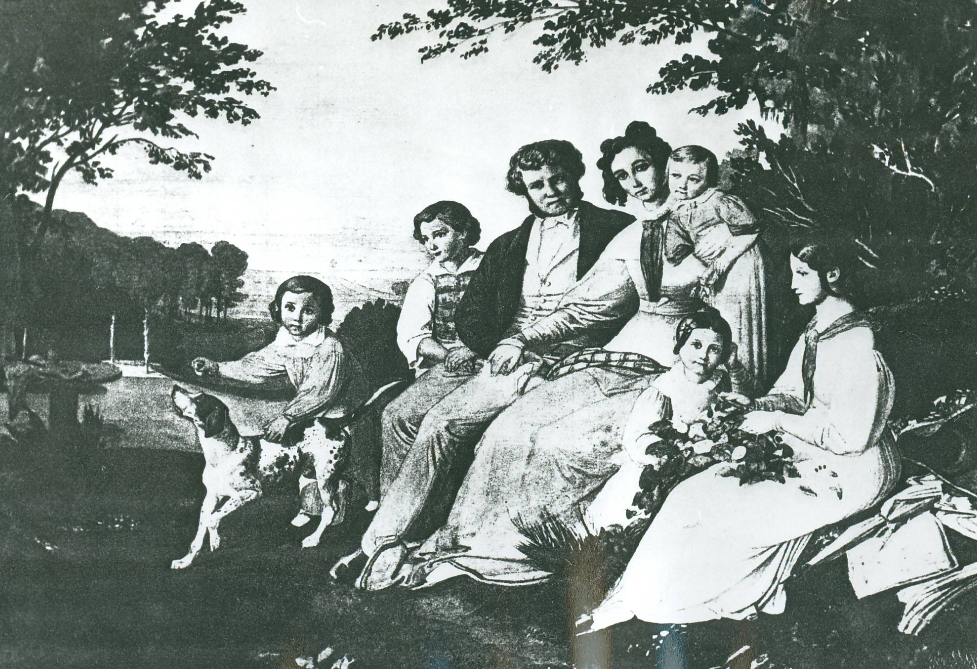
Photo of a 1845 painting showing Von Wedekind with his wife Wilhelmine Margarethe née Schubert (1800–1863) and five children

Von Wedekind was born in Strasbourg in a well-established family from Hanover. His father Georg Christian was a French military physician to the elector of Mainz but had moved to Strasbourg when it was taken by the Prussians. He moved back to Mainz in 1805 and in 1808 became a physician to Grand Duke Ludwig I at Darmstadt. The son went to school in Darmstadt and studied under Georg Bekker and Wilhelm Jakob Heyer. In 1812 he went to the University of Göttingen and in 1813 to Forstakademie Dreißigacker under Johann Matthäus Bechstein but during 1813-14 he became a Hessian Jagerkorps volunteer. He continued studies in 1815 and made study trips into the Weser and Harz mountains. He also traveled in the Styrian Alps. In 1816 he was posted as a forest master and in 1825 he became an Oberforstrat and was involved in teaching at the Darmstadt Oberforstkolleg. He retired in 1852 and settled in his Hiltersklingen estate in the Odenwald. He was a member of numerous learned societies.

He edited the journal Allgemeine Forst- und Jagdzeitung from 1847 to 1855. In his writings he sought the protection of grand old trees. He also wrote on bird protection in the Grand Duchy of Hesse.
