= Luther Lochman von Wedekind =

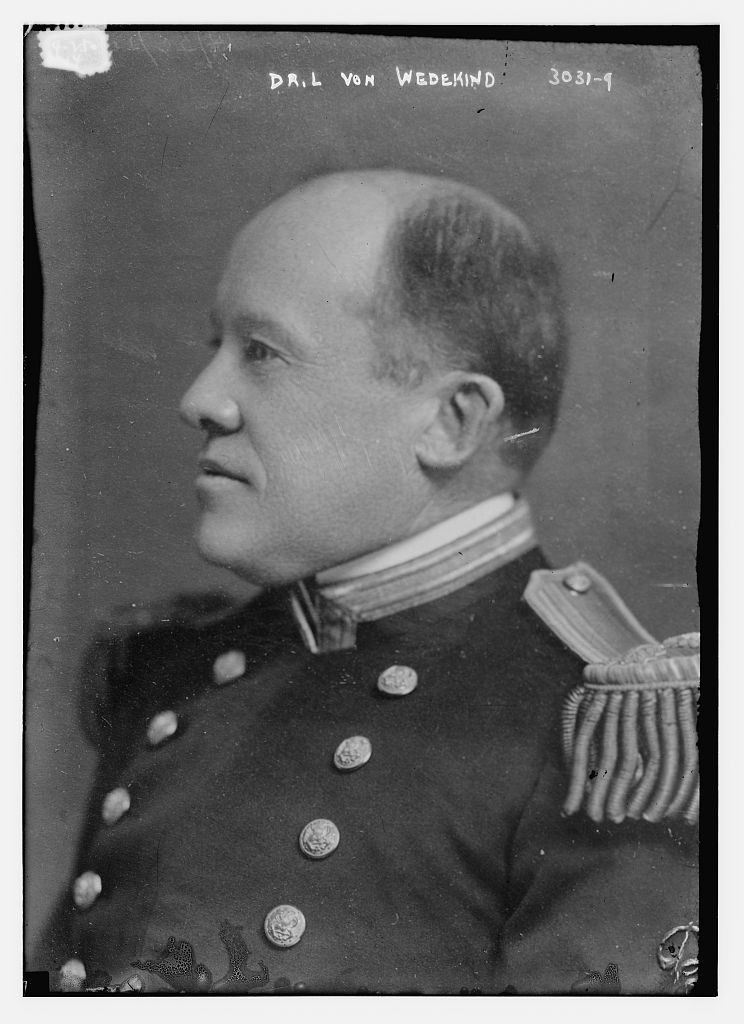

Luther Lochman von Wedekind (1864 – November 24, 1935) was medical director for the United States Navy. He was Commander of the hospital ship Solace.

== Biography ==
He was born in 1864 and graduated from Columbia University Medical School in 1886. He died of myocarditis on November 24, 1935.
