= List of short stories by Alice Munro =

This is a list of short stories written by Alice Munro. It includes stories that were published in single-author collections (books), the first story ever published, "The Dimensions of a Shadow" (1950), and other stories having appeared elsewhere.

== Short stories by title (sortable) ==
Some of the data in the list below are still needed in this spreadsheet, e.g., which journal a story was published in.

- 68 = Dance of the Happy Shades – 1968
- 71 = Lives of Girls and Women – 1971
- 74 = Something I've Been Meaning to Tell You – 1974
- 78 = Who Do You Think You Are? – 1978; also published as The Beggar Maid
- 82 = The Moons of Jupiter – 1982
- 86 = The Progress of Love – 1986
- 90 = Friend of My Youth – 1990
- 94 = Open Secrets – 1994
- 98 = The Love of a Good Woman – 1998
- 01 = Hateship, Friendship, Courtship, Loveship, Marriage – 2001
- 04 = Runaway – 2004
- 06 = The View from Castle Rock – 2006
- 09 = Too Much Happiness – 2009
- 12 = Dear Life – 2012

Compilations

- s96 = Selected Stories – 1996
- s03 = No Love Lost – 2003
- s04 = Vintage Munro – 2004
- s06 = Alice Munro's Best: A Selection of Stories – Toronto 2006/ Carried Away: A Selection of Stories – New York 2006; both with an introduction by Margaret Atwood
- s11 = New Selected Stories – 2011, published in 2014 as Lying under the Apple Tree. Selected Stories (Vintage, London)

a = in an anthology at about this time
f = first published in a collection (most likely a journal publication came later)
s = selected again for the compilation of the year given

Title	See also	Journal	68	71	74	78	82	86	90	94	98	01	04	06	09	12	s96	s03	s04	s06	s11
A Basket of Strawberries		1953-11																			
A Queer Streak								x													
A Real Life		1992-02-10								x											
A Trip to the Coast			x																		
A Wilderness Station		1992-04-27								x							s			s	
Accident		1977-11					x														
Age of Faith				x																	
Ally and Lizzy				x																	
Amundsen (short story)	de;	2012-08-27 Web														x					
An Ounce of Cure			x																		
At the Other Place		1955-09																			
Axis		2011-01-31																			
Baptizing				x																	
Bardon Bus							x											x			
Before the Change		1998-08-24									x										
Boys and Girls (Web)	de;	1964	x																		
Carried Away (short story)	de;	1991-10-21								x							s	s	s	s	
Chaddeleys and Flemings I: The Connection		1979					x										s				
Chaddeleys and Flemings II: The Stone in the Field		1979-04					x										s				
Chance		2004-06-14											x								s
Changes and Ceremonies				x																	
Characters		1978																			
Child's Play															x						
Circle of Prayer		1986						x													
Comfort												x									
Connection		1978-11																			
Corrie (short story)	de;	2010-10-11 Web														x					
Cortes Island		1998-10-12									x										
Dance of the Happy Shades		1961	x														s				
Day of the Butterfly		1956	x																		
Dear Life (short story)	de;	2011-09-19 Web														x					
Deep-Holes		2008-06-30 Web													x						s
Differently (short story)		1989-01-02							x								s		s	s	
Dimensions (short story)	de;	2006-06-05 Web													x						s
Dolly		2012-05-29														x					
Dulse		1980-07-21					x		a								s				
Epilogue: The Photographer				x																	
Eskimo		1985-12						x													
Executioners					x																
Face (short story)		2008-09-08 Web													x						
Family Furnishings												x									s
Fathers														x							
Fiction (short story)	de;	2007-08													x						
Fits		1986						x									s				
Five Points		1988-03-14							x												
Floating Bridge		2000-07-31										x									
Forgiveness in Families					x												s				
Free Radicals (short story)	de;	2008-02-11 Web													x						s
Friend of My Youth (short story)	de;	1990-01-22							x								s			s	
Goodbye Myra		1956-07																			
Goodness and Mercy		1989-03-20							x												
Gravel (short story)	de;	2011-06-27 Web														x					
Half a Grapefruit		1978-05				x															
Hard-Luck Stories							x														
Hateship, Friendship, Courtship, Loveship, Marriage (short story)	de;											x						s	s	s	s
Haven		2012-03-05														x					
Heirs of the Living Body				x																	
Hired Girl		1994-04-11											x								s
Hold Me Fast, Don't Let Me Pass		1988-12							x												
Home Web, 2006	de;	1974												x							
How Could I Do That?		1956-03																			
How I Met My Husband		1974-02			x																
Illinois														x							
Images			x														s				
In Sight of the Lake	de;	2012-02-22														x					
Jakarta	de;										x										
Jesse and Meribeth								x													
Labor Day Dinner		1981-09-28					x										s				
Leaving Maverley	de;	2011-11-28														x					
Lichen		1985-07-15						x									s				
Lives of Girls and Women				x																	
Lying Under the Apple Tree		2002-06-17												x							s
Marrakesh					x																
Material		1973-11			x												s				
Memorial					x																
Meneseteung	de;	1988-01-11							x								s	s			
Messenger														x							
Miles City, Montana		1985-01-14						x									s			s	
Mischief		1978-04				x												s			
Monsieur les Deux Chapeaux								x													
Mrs. Cross and Mrs. Kidd							x														
My Mother's Dream											x										s
Nettles		2000-02-21										x									
Night (short story)	de;	2012-Spring														x					
No Advantages														x							
Oh, What Avails		1987-11-16							x												
Open Secrets		1993-02-08								x											
Oranges and Apples		1988-10-24							x												
Passion (short story)	de;	2004-03-22 Web											x								
Pictures of the Ice		1990-01							x												
Post and Beam		2000-12-11										x									
Postcard		1968	x														s				
Powers													x								
Pride		2011-04														x					
Princess Ida				x																	
Privilege						x															
Providence		1977-08				x															
Prue		1981-03-30					x														
Queenie (short story)		1998-07-30 Web										x									
Red Dress—1946 /The Red Dress		-1973-03	f																		
Rich as Stink											x										
Royal Beatings		1977-03-14				x														s	
Runaway (short story)	de;	2003-08-11 Web											x							s	
Save the Reaper	de;	1998-06-22									x									s	
Silence		2004-06-14											x								s
Simon's Luck		1978				x											s	s			
Some Women		2008-12-22													x						
Something I've Been Meaning to Tell You		1974			x												s				
Soon		2005-06-14											x								s
Spaceships Have Landed										x											
Spelling		1978-06-17				x															
Story for Sunday		1950-12																			
Sunday Afternoon			x																		
Tell Me Yes or No		1974-03			x																
Thanks for the Ride			x																		
The Albanian Virgin	de;	1994-06-27 /07-04								x							s	s		s	
The Bear Came Over the Mountain	de;	1999-12-27 /2000-01-03 Web										x						s		s	s
The Beggar Maid		1977-06-27				x														s	
The Children Stay		1997-12-22									x							s			s
The Dangerous One		1957-07																			
The Dimensions of a Shadow		1950-04																			
The Edge of Town		1955-08																			
The Eye (short story)	de;															x					
The Ferguson Girls Must Never Marry		1982																			
The Flats Road				x																	
The Found Boat					x																
The Idyllic Summer		1954-08																			
The Jack Randa Hotel		1993-07-19								x											
The Love of a Good Woman (short story)	de;	1996-12-23									x							s			s
The Moon in the Orange Street Skating Rink		1986-03-31						x													
The Moons of Jupiter (short story)	de;	1978-05-22					x										s		s	s	
The Office			x																		
The Ottawa Valley		1974			x												s				
The Peace of Utrecht			x																		
The Progress of Love (short story)	de;	1985-10-07						x									s		s	s	
The Shining Houses			x																		
The Spanish Lady					x																
The Ticket														x							
The Time of Death			x																		
The Turkey Season		1980-12-29					x										s			s	
The View from Castle Rock	de;	2005-08-29												x							s
The Widower		1951-04																			
The Wilds of Morris Township														x							
To Reach Japan	de;	2012 Web														x					
Too Much Happiness		2009-08													x						
Train (short story)	de;	2012-04 Web														x					
Trespasses													x								
Tricks													x								
Vandals		1993-10-04								x							s			s	
Visitors		1982-04					x														
Voices (short story)	de;															x					
Walker Brothers Cowboy		1968	x														s				
Walking on Water					x																
Wenlock Edge (short story)	de;	2005-12-05 Web													x						
What Do You Want to Know For?		1994								a				x							
What is Remembered		2001-01-19										x									
White Dump		1986-07-28						x									s				
Who Do You Think You Are?						x															
Wigtime		1989-09-04							x												
Wild Swans		1978-04				x											s				
Winter Wind					x																
Wood (short story) (Web, 2009)	de;	1980-11-24													x						
Working for a Living		1981-08												x							

== Short stories by title ==
This list contains some extra information compared with the table above.

- "A Basket of Strawberries" in Mayfair (November 1953), 32–33, 78–80, 82.
- "A Better Place Than Home" in Newcomers (1979), 113–124.
- "A Queer Streak" in The Progress of Love, 1986
- "A Real Life" in The New Yorker, 10 February 1992, 30–40. Extended summary, in Open Secrets, 1994
- "A Trip to the Coast" first read on the CBC programme Anthology; in Dance of the Happy Shades, 1968, 172–189; in Evolution of Canadian Literature in English (1973), 201–211.
- "A Wilderness Station" in The New Yorker, 27 April 1992, 35–46, 48–51 (originally created 1992); Extended summary, in Open Secrets, 1994 (republished in 1996 and 2006/ 2008)
- "Accident" in Toronto Life (November 1977), 61, 87–88, 90–95, 149–153, 158–160, 162–165, 167, 169–173. (originally created 1977); in The Moons of Jupiter, 1982
- "Age of Faith" in Lives of Girls and Women, 1971
- "Ally and Lizzy" in Lives of Girls and Women, 1971
- "Amundsen" in The New Yorker, 27 August 2012, Web in Dear Life. Stories, 2012, pp. 31–66 (35 p.)
- "An Ounce of Cure" in The Montrealer 35 (May 1961), 26–30; in Dance of the Happy Shades, 1968; in Sixteen by Twelve (1970), 103–112; in Singing Under Ice (1974), 147–160; in Sunlight & Shadows (1974), 52–62; in Canadian Humour and Satire (1976), 99–111; in Canadian Stories of Action and Adventure (1978), 51–64.
- "At the Other Place" in Canadian Forum 35 (September 1955), 131–133, by Alice Laidlaw
- "Axis" in The New Yorker, 31 January 2011, Summary
- "Baptizing" in Lives of Girls and Women, 1971
- "Bardon Bus" in The Moons of Jupiter, 1982 (republished in 2003)
- "Before the Change" in The New Yorker, 24 August 1998, Extended summary, in The Love of a Good Woman, 1998
- "Boys and Girls", The Montrealer 38 (December 1964), 25–34, Web, in Dance of the Happy Shades, 1968; in Sixteen by Twelve, 1970, 112–124; in Four Hemispheres, 1971, 89–101; in Die Weite Reise as "Jungen und Mädchen", translated by Karl Heinrich, 1974, 285–304; in Women in Canadian Literature, 1976, 11–21; in La dance des ombres, as "Garçons et filles", 1979, 143–162; in New Worlds, 1980, 120–132.
- "Carried Away" in The New Yorker, 21 October 1991, 34–46, 48–58, 60–61 (originally created 1991); Extended summary, in Open Secrets, 1994 (republished in 1996, 2003, 2004 and 2006/ 2008)
- "Chaddeleys and Flemings I: The Connection" in Chatelaine, 1979 in The Moons of Jupiter, 1982 (republished in 1996) see also "Connection"
- "Chaddeleys and Flemings II: The Stone in the Field" in Saturday Night, 1979 in The Moons of Jupiter, 1982 (republished in 1996), see also "The Stone in the Field" in Saturday Night 94 (April 1979), 40–45. 1979.
- "Chance" in The New Yorker, 14 June 2004, Teaser plus beginning only, in Runaway, 2004 (republished in 2011 and in 2014)
- "Changes and Ceremonies" in Lives of Girls and Women, 1971
- "Characters" in Ploughshares (U.S.) 4, no. 3 (1978), 72–82 (originally created 1978);
- "Child's Play" in Too much happiness, 2009
- "Circle of Prayer" in Paris Review 100 (summer/fall 1986), 31–51. in The Progress of Love, 1986
- "Comfort" (35 p.) in Hateship, Friendship, Courtship, Loveship, Marriage, 2001
- "Connection" in Chatelaine 51 (November 1978), 66–67, 97–98, 101, 104, 106 (originally created 1978); see also "Chaddeleys and Flemings I: The Connection"
- "Corrie" in The New Yorker, 11 October 2010, Web, Dear Life. Stories, 2012, pp. 154–174 (20 p.)
- "Cortes Island" in The New Yorker, 12 October 1998, Extended summary, in The Love of a Good Woman, 1998
- "Dance of the Happy Shades" in The Montrealer, 35 (1961), 22–26; in Dance of the Happy Shades, 1968; in Canadian Short Stories II, 1968, 285–300; in Narrative Voice, 1972, 171–180; in Canadian Century, 1973, 491–501; in Here and Now, 1977, 80–95; in La dance des ombres, as "La dance des ombres", 259–273. (republished in 1996)
- "Day of the Butterfly" originally published as "Goodbye Myra" in Chatelaine 28 (July 1956), 17, 55–58. in Dance of the Happy Shades, 1968; in Kaleidoscope (1972), 92–102; in Ontario Experience (1976), 201–112; in Crossroads 2 (1979), 52–63; in Inquiry into Literature 4 (1980), 54–63.
- "Dear Life" first with subtitle "A childhood visitation" in The New Yorker/ Personal History, 19 September 2011, Web, without any subtitle in Dear Life. Stories, 2012, pp. 299–319 (20 p.)
- "Deep-Holes" in The New Yorker, 30 June 2008, Web, in Too much happiness, 2009 (republished in 2011 and in 2014)
- "Differently" in The New Yorker, 2 January 1989, 23–36; in Friend of My Youth, 1990 (republished in 1996, 2004 and 2006/ 2008)
- "Dimension" in The New Yorker, 5 June 2006, Web; published with title "Dimensions" (in the plural); in Too much happiness, 2009 (republished in 2011 and in 2014)
- "Dolly" in Tin House, 29 May 2012 in Dear Life. Stories, 2012, pp. 233–256 (23 p.)
- "Dulse" in The New Yorker, 21 July 1980, 30–39, in The Moons of Jupiter, 1982; in The Penguin Book of Modern Canadian Short Stories, edited by Wayne Grady, Markham, Ont.: Penguin Books Canada, 1982, 463–81. (republished in 1996)
- "Epilogue: The Photographer" in Lives of Girls and Women, 1971
- "Eskimo" in Gentlemen's Quarterly 55, no. 12 (December 1985), 262–66, 301–302, 304 (originally created 1985); in The Progress of Love, 1986
- "Executioners" in Something I’ve Been Meaning to Tell You, 1974, 138–155.
- "Face" in The New Yorker, 8 September 2008, Web, in Too much happiness, 2009
- "Family Furnishings" (33 p.) in Hateship, Friendship, Courtship, Loveship, Marriage, 2001 (republished in 2011 and in 2014)
- "Fathers" in The View from Castle Rock, 2006
- "Fiction" in Harper's Magazine, August 2007, in Too much happiness, 2009
- "Fits" in Grand Street, 1986, in The Progress of Love, 1986 (republished in 1996)
- "Five Points" in The New Yorker, 14 March 1988, 34–43. in Friend of My Youth, 1990
- "Floating Bridge" in The New Yorker, 31 July 2000, Teaser plus beginning only, in Hateship, Friendship, Courtship, Loveship, Marriage, 2001 (30 p.)
- "Forgiveness in Families" first read on the CBC programme Anthology 10 March 1973; in Something I’ve Been Meaning to Tell You, 1974, 93–105; in West Coast Experience (1976), 32–44; in Heartland (1983), 107–117; in West of Fiction (1983), 220–230. (republished in 1996)
- "Free Radicals" in The New Yorker, 11 February 2008, Web, in Too much happiness, 2009 (republished in 2011 and in 2014)
- "Friend of My Youth" in The New Yorker, 22 January 1990, 36–48 (originally created 1990); Extended summary, in Friend of My Youth, 1990 (republished in 1996 and 2006/ 2008)
- "Goodbye Myra" in Chatelaine 28 (July 1956), 17, 55–58; later republished in Dance of the Happy Shades as "Day of the Butterfly"
- "Goodness and Mercy" in The New Yorker, 20 March 1989, 38–48. in Friend of My Youth, 1990
- "Gravel" in The New Yorker, 27 June 2011, Web; in Dear Life. Stories, 2012, pp. 91–109 (18 p.)
- "Half a Grapefruit" in Redbook 151, no. 1 (May 1978), 133, 176, 178, 180, 182–83 (originally created 1978); in Who Do You Think You Are?, 1978
- "Hard-Luck Stories" in The Moons of Jupiter, 1982
- "Hateship, Friendship, Courtship, Loveship, Marriage" (51 p.) in Hateship, Friendship, Courtship, Loveship, Marriage, 2001 (republished in 2003, 2004, 2006/ 2008, 2011, and 2014)
- "Haven" in The New Yorker, 5 March 2012 in Dear Life. Stories, 2012, pp. 110–132 (22 p.)
- "Heirs of the Living Body" in Lives of Girls and Women, 1971
- "Hired Girl" in The New Yorker, 11 April 1994, 82–88. Extended summary; in The View from Castle Rock, 2006 (republished in 2011 and in 2014)
- "Hold Me Fast, Don't Let Me Pass" in Atlantic Monthly 262, no. 6 (December 1988), 58–66, 68–70. in Friend of My Youth, 1990
- "Home" in New Canadian Stories, Vol. 74, edited by David Helwig and Georg Euringer, Ottawa: Oberon Press, 1974, pp. 133–53. ISBN 0-88750-126-5; ISBN 0-88750-127-3, revised and published in The View from Castle Rock, 2006 Web (2006?)
- "How Could I Do That?" in Chatelaine 28 (March 1956), 16–17, 65–70.
- "How I Met My Husband" in McCalls (February 1974), 85–86, 123–27. in Something I’ve Been Meaning to Tell You, 1974, 45–66; in Modern Canadian Stories (1975), 1–20; in Personal Fictions (1977), 21–37.
- "Illinois" in The View from Castle Rock, 2006
- "Images" in Dance Of the Happy Shades, 1968; in Narrative Voice (1972), 161–171; in Double Vision (1976), 229–241; in Personal Fictions (1977), 9–20. (republished in Selected Stories, 1996)
- "In Sight of the Lake" in Granta, 22 February 2012 in Dear Life. Stories, 2012, pp. 217–232 (15 p.)
- "Jakarta" in The Love of a Good Woman, 1998
- "Jesse and Meribeth" in The Progress of Love, 1986
- "Labor Day Dinner" in The New Yorker, 28 September 1981, 47–56, 59–60, 65–66, 70, 75–76. in The Moons of Jupiter, 1982 (republished in 1996)
- "Leaving Maverley" in The New Yorker, 28 November 2011, Summary, in Dear Life. Stories, 2012, pp. 67–90 (23 p.)
- "Lichen" in The New Yorker, 15 July 1985, 26–36. in The Progress of Love, 1986 (republished in 1996)
- "Lives of Girls and Women" in Lives of Girls and Women, 1971
- "Love of a Good Woman" in The New Yorker, 23 December 1996; in The Love of a Good Woman, 1998
- "Lying Under the Apple Tree" in The New Yorker/ Memoir, 17 June 2002, Teaser plus beginning only, in The View from Castle Rock, 2006; (republished in 2011 and in 2014)
- "Marrakesh" in Something I’ve Been Meaning to Tell You, 1974, 156–174.
- "Material" in Tamarack Review no. 61 (November 1973), 7–25. in Something I’ve Been Meaning to Tell You, 1974, 24–44; in Double Vision (1976), 242–259; in Personal Fictions (1977), 55–71; in Best Canadian Short Stories (1978), 24–38; in Canadian Short Stories 3 (1978), 241–263. (republished in 1996)
- "Memorial" in Something I’ve Been Meaning to Tell You, 1974, 207–226.
- "Meneseteung" in The New Yorker, 11 January 1988, 28–38; in Friend of My Youth, 1990 (republished in 1996, 2003 and 2006/ 2008); in The Best American Short Stories of the Eighties, 1990
- "Messenger" in The View from Castle Rock, 2006
- "Miles City, Montana" in The New Yorker, 14 January 1985, 30–40; in The Progress of Love, 1986 (republished in 1996 and 2006/ 2008)
- "Mischief" in Viva 6 (April 1978), 99–109 (originally created 1978); in Who Do You Think You Are?, 1978 (republished in 2003)
- "Monsieur les Deux Chapeaux" in The Progress of Love, 1986
- "Mrs. Cross and Mrs. Kidd" in The Moons of Jupiter, 1982; in Tamarack Review Nos. 83/84 (Winter 1982), 5–24.
- "My Mother's Dream" in The Love of a Good Woman, 1998 (republished in 2011 and in 2014)
- "Nettles" in The New Yorker, 21 February 2000, Teaser plus beginning only, in Hateship, Friendship, Courtship, Loveship, Marriage, 2001 (31 p.)
- "Night" in Granta Spring 2012, beginning of the story in Dear Life. Stories, 2012, pp. 271–286 (14 p.)
- "No Advantages" in The View from Castle Rock, 2006
- "Oh, What Avails" in The New Yorker, 16 November 1987, 42–52, 55–56, 58–59, 62, 64–65, 67. in Friend of My Youth, 1990
- "Open Secrets" in The New Yorker, 8 February 1993, 90–101. Extended summary, in Open Secrets, 1994
- "Oranges and Apples" in The New Yorker, 24 October 1988, 36–48, 52, 54. in Friend of My Youth, 1990
- "Passion" in The New Yorker, 22 March 2004, Web, in Runaway, 2004
- "Pictures of the Ice" in Atlantic Monthly (January 1990), 64–73 (originally created 1990); in Friend of My Youth, 1990
- "Post and Beam" in The New Yorker, 11 December 2000, Teaser plus beginning only, in Hateship, Friendship, Courtship, Loveship, Marriage, 2001 (30 p.)
- "Postcard" in The Tamarack Review, 1968 No. 47 (Spring 1968), 23–31, 33–39. in Dance of the Happy Shades, 1968 (republished in 1996)
- "Powers" in Runaway, 2004
- "Pride" in Harper's Magazine, April 2011, in Dear Life. Stories, 2012, pp. 133–153 (20 p.)
- "Princess Ida" in Lives of Girls and Women, 1971
- "Privilege" in Tamarack Review No. 70 (Winter 1977), 14–28. in Who Do You Think You Are?, 1978
- "Providence" first read on the CBC programme Anthology 9 April 1977; in Redbook 149, no. 4 (August 1977), 98–99, 158–63 (originally created 1977); in Who Do You Think You Are?, 1978, 133–151.
- "Prue" in The New Yorker, 30 March 1981, 34–35; in The Moons of Jupiter, 1982; in 82: Best Canadian Stories, 74–79;
- "Queenie" in London Review of Books (30 July 1998) Web, in Hateship, Friendship, Courtship, Loveship, Marriage, 2001 (31 p.)
- "Red Dress—1946" in Montrealer 39 (May 1965), 28–34; in Dance of the Happy Shades, 1968, 147–160; in In the Looking Glass (1977), 199–211; in Childhood and Youth in Canadian Literature (1979), 74–86; in Rites of Passage (1979), 8–19; see also "The Red Dress"
- "Rich as Stink" in The Love of a Good Woman, 1998
- "Royal Beatings" in The New Yorker, 14 March 1977, 36–44 (originally created 1977); in Who Do You Think You Are?, 1978, 1–22; in Norton Anthology of Short Fiction (1981), 473–491; (republished in 2006/ 2008)
- "Runaway" in The New Yorker, 11 August 2003, available on the Web, a less elaborate version than the one published in 2004 in Runaway, 2004 (republished in 2006/ 2008)
- "Save the Reaper" in The New Yorker, 22 June 1998, in The Love of a Good Woman, 1998 (republished in 2006/ 2008)
- "Silence" in The New Yorker, 14 June 2004, Teaser plus beginning only, in Runaway, 2004 (republished in 2011 and in 2014)
- "Simon's Luck" in Viva, 1978, under the title "Emily"; in Who Do You Think You Are?, 1978, 251–173; (republished in 1996 and 2003)
- "Some Women" in The New Yorker, 22 December 2008, Summary; in Too much happiness, 2009;
- "Something I've Been Meaning to Tell You" first published in Something I’ve Been Meaning to Tell You, 1974, 1–23; in Canadian Literature in the 70's (1980), 19–35; in Anthology of Canadian Literature in English 2 (1983), 301–314. (republished in 1996)
- "Soon" in The New Yorker, 14 June 2004, Teaser plus beginning only, in Runaway, 2004 (republished in 2011 and in 2014)
- "Spaceships Have Landed" in Open Secrets, 1994
- "Spelling" in Weekend Magazine 28 (17 June 1978), 24–27 (originally created 1978); in Who Do You Think You Are?, 1978, 174–188; in Weekend 28 (17 June 1978), 24–27; in Best American Short Stories 1979, 150–156.
- "Story for Sunday" in Folio 5, no. 1 (December 1950), 4–8. by Alice Laidlaw Folio 5:1 [January 1951], [5 pp.]
- "Sunday Afternoon" in The Canadian Forum 35 (September 1957), 127–130; in Book of Canadian Short Stories (1962), 327–336; in Dance of the Happy Shades, 1968, 161–171; in Selections from Major Canadian Writers (1974), 244–249;
- "Tell Me Yes or No" in Chatelaine 47 (March 1974), 35, 54, 56–60, 62 (originally created 1974); in Something I’ve Been Meaning to Tell You, 1974, 106–124.
- "Thanks for the Ride" in Tamarack Review No. 2 (Winter 1957), 25–37; in Dance of the Happy Shades, 1968, 44–58; in Story-Makers (1970), 47–60; in Modern Short Stories in English (1975), 273–284; in Penguin Book of Modern Canadian Short Stories (1982), 71–82.
- "The Albanian Virgin" in The New Yorker, 27 June & 4 July 1994 (double issue), 118, 121, 123–27, 129–34, 136–38. Extended summary, in Open Secrets, 1994 (republished in 1996, 2003 and 2006/ 2008)
- "The Bear Came Over the Mountain" in The New Yorker, 27 December 1999 / 3 January 2000, "27 December 1999": just a summary in paraphrase incl. some quotes"21 October 2013" available on the Web; this is the less elaborate version of 1999. in Hateship, Friendship, Courtship, Loveship, Marriage, 2001 (republished in 2003, 2006/ 2008, 2011, and 2014) (49 p.)
- "The Beggar Maid" in The New Yorker, 27 June 1977; in Who Do You Think You Are?, 1978; in 78: Best Canadian Stories, 9–42; in Best Canadian Short Stories (1981), 96–121. (republished in 2006/ 2008)
- "The Children Stay" in The New Yorker, 22 December 1997, Extended summary, in The Love of a Good Woman, 1998 (republished in 2003, 2011, and 2014)
- "The Connection" see "Chaddeleys and Flemings I: The Connection" and/or "Connection"
- "The Dangerous One" in Chatelaine 29 (July 1957), 49–51.
- "The Dimensions of a Shadow" (by Alice Laidlaw) in Folio 4, no. 2 (April 1950), 2–8.
- "The Edge of Town" in Queen's Quarterly 62, no. 3 (Autumn 1955), 368–80.
- "The Eye" (13 p.) in Dear Life. Stories, 2012, pp. 257–270
- "The Ferguson Girls Must Never Marry" in Grand Street 1, no. 3 (Spring 1982), 27–64 (originally created 1982).
- "The Flats Road" in Lives of Girls and Women, 1971
- "The Found Boat" first read on the CBC programme Anthology 6 April 1974; in Something I’ve Been Meaning to Tell You, 1974, 125–137; in Role of Woman in Canadian Literature (1975), 70–81.
- "The Idyllic Summer" in Canadian Forum 34 (August 1954), 106–107, 109–110.
- "The Jack Randa Hotel" in The New Yorker, 19 July 1993, 62–70. Extended summary, in Open Secrets, 1994
- "The Love of a Good Woman" in The New Yorker, 23 December 1996, Extended summary, in The Love of a Good Woman, 1998 (republished in 2003, 2011, and 2014)
- "The Moon in the Orange Street Skating Rink" in The New Yorker, 31 March 1986, 26–36, 38–40, 44. in The Progress of Love, 1986
- "The Moons of Jupiter" in The New Yorker, 22 May 1978, 32–39 (originally created 1978); in The Moons of Jupiter, 1982; in Anthology of Canadian Literature in English 2 (1983), 314–326. (republished in 1996, 2004 and 2006/ 2008)
- "The Office" in The Montrealer 36 (September 1962), 18–23 in Dance of the Happy Shades, 1968; in Great Canadian Short Stories (1971), 263–275; in Women and Fiction (1975), 301–313; in Transitions 2 (1978), 141–152.
- "The Ottawa Valley" first published in Something I’ve Been Meaning to Tell You, 1974, 227–246. (republished in 1996)
- "The Peace of Utrecht" in Tamarack Review No. 15 (Spring 1960), 5–21 in Canadian Short Stories 2 (1968), 259–284; in Dance of the Happy Shades, 1968; in Stories from Ontario (1974), 241–259; in Personal Fictions (1977), 38–54.
- "The Photographer" in Artist in Canadian Literature (1976), 93–104.
- "The Progress of Love" in The New Yorker, 7 October 1985, 35–58. in The Progress of Love, 1986 (republished in 1996, 2004 and 2006/ 2008)
- "The Red Dress" in McCalls (March 1973), 67–68, 138–46. see also "Red Dress—1946"
- "The Shining Houses" first read on the CBC programme Anthology; in Dance of the Happy Shades, 1968, 19–29; in Canadian Anthology (1974), 520–526.
- "The Spanish Lady" in Something I’ve Been Meaning to Tell You, 1974, 175–199.
- "The Stone in the Field" in Saturday Night 94 (April 1979), 40–45; in 80: Best Canadian Stories, 115–131–; in Iniquiry into Literature 2 (1980), 182–183 [excerpt]; see also "Chaddeleys and Flemings II: The Stone in the Field"
- "The Ticket" in The View from Castle Rock, 2006
- "The Time of Death" in The Canadian Forum 36 (June 1956) 63–66, by Alice Laidlaw; in Modern Canadian Stories (1966), 314–323; in Dance of the Happy Shades, 1968, 89–99; in Contemporary Voices (1972), 128–134;
- "The Turkey Season" in The New Yorker, 29 December 1980, 36–44, in The Moons of Jupiter, 1982, 60–76; (republished in 1996 and 2006/ 2008)
- "The View from Castle Rock" in The New Yorker, 29 August 2005, Web, in The View from Castle Rock, 2006 (republished in 2011 and in 2014)
- "The Widower" in Folio 5, no. 2 (April 1951), 7–11 by Alice Laidlaw.
- "The Wilds of Morris Township" in The View from Castle Rock, 2006
- "To Reach Japan" in Narrative Magazine, in Winter 2012, Web.
- "Too Much Happiness" in Harper's Magazine, August 2009; in Too much happiness, 2009
- "Train" in Harper's Magazine, April 2004 Web, Dear Life. Stories, 2012, pp. 175–216 (41 p.)
- "Trespasses" in Runaway, 2004
- "Tricks" in Runaway, 2004
- "Vandals" in The New Yorker, 4 October 1993, 179–182, 184–190. Extended summary, in Open Secrets, 1994 (republished in 1996 and 2006/ 2008)
- "Visitors" in Atlantic Monthly 249, no. 4 (April 1982), 91–98; in The Moons of Jupiter, 1982, 198–216.
- "Voices" no longer available on the Web, in Dear Life. Stories, 2012, pp. 286–298, (12 p.)
- "Walker Brothers Cowboy" first published in Dance of the Happy Shades, 1968, 1–18; in Canadian Writing Today (1970), 105–120; in Oxford Anthology of Canadian Literature (1973), 348–361; in Stories from Ontario (1974), 156–171; in Depression in Canadian Literature (1976), 92–109; (republished in 1996)
- "Walking on Water" in Something I’ve Been Meaning to Tell You, 1974, 67–92.
- "Wenlock Edge" in The New Yorker, 5 December 2005, Web, in Too much happiness, 2009
- "What Do You Want to Know For?" in Writing Away: The PEN Canada Travel Anthology, edited by Constance Rooke, 203–20. Toronto: McClelland and Stewart, 1994 (originally created 1994); in The View from Castle Rock, 2006; in American Scholar (Washington, DC) (75:3) Summer 2006, 94–105.
- "What is Real?" in The Norton Anthology of Short Fiction, edited by R. V. Cassill and Richard Bausch, 6th edition, W W. Norton, New York, 2000, pp. 1706–1709.
- "What is Remembered" in The New Yorker, 19 February 2001, Teaser plus beginning only, in Hateship, Friendship, Courtship, Loveship, Marriage, 2001 (23 p.)
- "White Dump" in The New Yorker, 28 July 1986, 25–39, 42–43. in The Progress of Love, 1986 (republished in 1996)
- "Who Do You Think You Are?" in Who Do You Think You Are?, 1978, 189–206; in Penguin Book of Canadian Short Stories (1980), 299–316.
- "Wigtime" in The New Yorker, 4 September 1989, 34–46, 48, 50. in Friend of My Youth, 1990
- "Wild Swans" in Who Do You Think You Are?, 1978, 55–64; in Toronto Life (April 1978), 53, 124–125 (originally created 1978); (republished in 1996)
- "Winter Wind" in Something I’ve Been Meaning to Tell You, 1974, 192–206; in Family Portraits (1978), 57–67; in Literature in Canada (1978), 477–487.
- "Wood" in The New Yorker, 24 November 1980, 49–54; in 81: Best Canadian Stories, 93–110; in Best American Short Stories (1981), 241–254; revised in Too much happiness, 2009 Web
- "Working for a Living" in Grand Street 1, no. 1 (Autumn 1981), 9–37 (originally created 1981); in The View from Castle Rock, 2006

== Short stories in anthologies ==
Works by Munro that appeared in anthologies may be more difficult to locate than those that were published in journals or in Munro's original collections but they are likely to be numerous. Please add.

- "Dulse" in: The Penguin Book of Modern Canadian Short Stories, edited by Wayne Grady, Markham, Ont.: Penguin Books Canada, 1982, 463–81.
- "Forgiveness in Families" in "Vancouver Short Stories", edited by Carole Gerson, Vancouver, BC: UBC Press, 1986, 94-103.
- "Meneseteung" in The Best American Short Stories of the Eighties, edited by Shannon Ravenel, Houghton Mifflin Harcourt, 1990

== Short stories by short-story compilation ==
=== Selected Stories (1996) ===
- "Walker Brothers Cowboy" (previously published in 1968)
- "Dance of the Happy Shades" (previously published in 1968)
- "Postcard" (previously published in 1968)
- "Images" (previously published in 1968)
- "Something I've Been Meaning to Tell You" (previously published in 1974)
- "The Ottawa Valley" (previously published in 1974)
- "Material" (previously published in 1974)
- "Royal Beatings" (previously published in 1978) (republished in 2006/ 2008)
- "Wild Swans" (previously published in 1978)
- "The Beggar Maid" (previously published in 1978) (republished in 2006/ 2008)
- "Simon's Luck" (previously published in 1978) (republished in 2003)
- "Chaddeleys and Flemings I: The Connection" (previously published in 1982)
- "Chaddeleys and Flemings II: The Stone in the Field" (previously published in 1982)
- "Dulse" (previously published in 1982)
- "The Turkey Season" (previously published in 1982) (republished in 2006/ 2008)
- "Labor Day Dinner" (previously published in 1982)
- "The Moons of Jupiter" (previously published in 1982) (republished in 2004 and 2006/ 2008)
- "The Progress of Love" (previously published in 1986) (republished in 2004 and 2006/ 2008)
- "Lichen" (previously published in 1986)
- "Miles City, Montana" (previously published in 1986) (republished in 2006/ 2008)
- "Forgiveness in Families" (previously published in 1974)
- "White Dump" (previously published in 1986)
- "Fits" (previously published in 1986)
- "Friend of My Youth" (previously published in 1990) (republished in 2006/ 2008)
- "Meneseteung" (previously published in 1990) (republished in 2003 and 2006/ 2008)
- "Differently" (previously published in 1990) (republished in 2004 and 2006/ 2008)
- "Carried Away" (previously published in 1994) (republished in 2003, 2004 and 2006/ 2008)
- "The Albanian Virgin" (previously published in 1994) (republished in 2003 and 2006/ 2008)
- "A Wilderness Station" (previously published in 1994) (republished in 2006/ 2008)
- "Vandals" (previously published in 1994) (republished in 2006/ 2008)

=== No Love Lost (2003) ===
Selected and with an afterword by Jane Urquhart

- "Bardon Bus" (previously published in 1982)
- "Carried Away" (previously published in 1994 and 1996) (republished in 2004 and 2006/ 2008)
- "Mischief" (previously published in 1978)
- "The Love of a Good Woman" (previously published in 1998) (republished in 2011)
- "Simon's Luck" (previously published in 1978 and 1996)
- "Hateship, Friendship, Courtship, Loveship, Marriage" (previously published in 2001) (republished in 2004, 2006/ 2008 and 2011)
- "The Bear Came Over the Mountain" (1999) available on the Web (previously published in 2001) (republished in 2006/ 2008 and 2011)
- "The Albanian Virgin" (previously published in 1994 and 1996) (republished in 2006/ 2008)
- "Meneseteung" (previously published in 1990 and 1996) (republished in 2006/ 2008)
- "The Children Stay" (previously published in 1998) (republished in 2011)

=== Vintage Munro (2004) ===
according to this Table of Contents

- "The Moons of Jupiter" (previously published in 1982 and 1996) (republished in 2006/ 2008)
- "The Progress of Love" (previously published in 1986 and 1996) (republished in 2006/ 2008)
- "Differently" (previously published in 1990 and 1996) (republished in 2006/ 2008)
- "Carried Away" (previously published in 1994, 1996, and 2003) (republished in 2006/ 2008)
- "Hateship, Friendship, Courtship, Loveship, Marriage" (previously published in 2001, 2003) (republished in 2006/ 2008 and 2011)

=== Alice Munro's Best: A Selection of Stories, XVIII, 509 p. (Toronto 2006/2008) / Carried Away: A Selection of Stories, XXXV, 559 p. (New York 2006) ===
With an introduction by Margaret Atwood

- "Royal Beatings" (2006: p. 1) 2008: p. 1
- "The Beggar Maid" (2006: p. 27) 2008: p. 25 (previously published in 1978)
- "The Turkey Season" (2006: p. 65) 2008: p. 59 (previously published in 1982, 1996)
- "The Moons of Jupiter" (2006: p. 83) 2008: p. 75 (previously published in 1982, 1996, 2004)
- "The Progress of Love" (2006: p. 101) 2008: p. 93 (previously published in 1986, 1996, 2004)
- "Miles City, Montana" (2006: p. 131) 2008: p. 121 (previously published in 1986, 1996 and 2006/ 2008)
- "Friend of my Youth" (2006: p. 155) 2008: p. 155 (previously published in 1990, 1996)
- "Meneseteung" (2006: p. 179) 2008: p. 165 (previously published in 1990, 1996, 2003)
- "Differently" (2006: p. 203) 2008: p. 187 (previously published in 1990, 1996, 2004)
- "Carried Away" (2006: p. 231) 2008: p. 213 (previously published in 1994, 1996, 2003, 2004)
- "The Albanian Virgin" (2006: p. 277) 2008: p. 255 (previously published in 1994, 1996, 2004)
- "A Wilderness Station" (2006: p. 323) 2008: p. 295 (previously published in 1994, 1996)
- "Vandals" (2006: p. 357) 2008: p. 325 (previously published in 1994, 1996)
- "Hateship, Friendship, Courtship, Loveship, Marriage" (2006: p. 389) 2008: p. 353 (previously published in 2001, 2003, 2004) (republished in 2011)
- "Save the Reaper" (2006: p. 439) 2008: p. 399 (previously published in 1998)
- "Runaway" (2003) available on the Web (2006: p. 472) 2008: p. 429 (previously published in 2004)
- "The Bear Came Over the Mountain" (1999) available on the Web (2006: p. 513) 2008: p. 467 (previously published in 2001) (republished in 2011)

=== New Selected Stories (2011) ===
From The Love of a Good Woman (1998)

- "The Love of a Good Woman" 3 (previously published in 1998, 2003)
- "The Children Stay" 56 (previously published in 1998, 2003)
- "My Mother's Dream" 79 (previously published in 1998)

From Hateship, Friendship, Courtship, Loveship, Marriage (2001)

- "Hateship, Friendship, Courtship, Loveship, Marriage" 115 (previously published in 2001, 2003, 2004, 2006/ 2008)
- "Family Furnishings" 153 (previously published in 2001)
- "The Bear Came Over the Mountain" (1999) available on the Web 178 (previously published in 2001, 2003, 2006/ 2008)

From Runaway (2004)

- "Chance" 217 (previously published in 2004)
- "Soon" 244 (previously published in 2004)
- "Silence" 272 (previously published in 2004)

From The View from Castle Rock (2006)

- "The View from Castle Rock" 297 (previously published in 2006)
- "Lying Under the Apple Tree" 338 (previously published in 2006)
- "Hired Girl" 358 (previously published in 2006)

From Too much happiness (2009)

- "Dimensions" 379 (previously published in 2009)
- "Deep-Holes" 402 available on the Web (previously published in 2009)
- "Free Radicals" (2008) 419 available on the Web (previously published in 2009)

=== Vintage Munro (2014) ===
According to the Buffalo & Erie County Library

- "The Moons of Jupiter" (previously published in 1982 and 1996) (republished in 2006/ 2008 and 2014)
- "The Progress of Love" (previously published in 1986 and 1996) (republished in 2006/ 2008 and 2014)
- "Differently" (previously published in 1990 and 1996) (republished in 2006/ 2008 and 2014)
- "Carried Away" (previously published in 1994, 1996, and 2003) (republished in 2006/ 2008 and 2014)
- "Hateship, Friendship, Courtship, Loveship, Marriage" (previously published in 2001, 2003) (republished in 2006/ 2008/ 2011 and 2014)
- "In Sight of the Lake" (previously published in 2012) (republished in 2014)
- The Nobel Prize in Literature 2013: Presentation Speech
