= 2013 Nobel Prize in Literature =

- Alice Munro
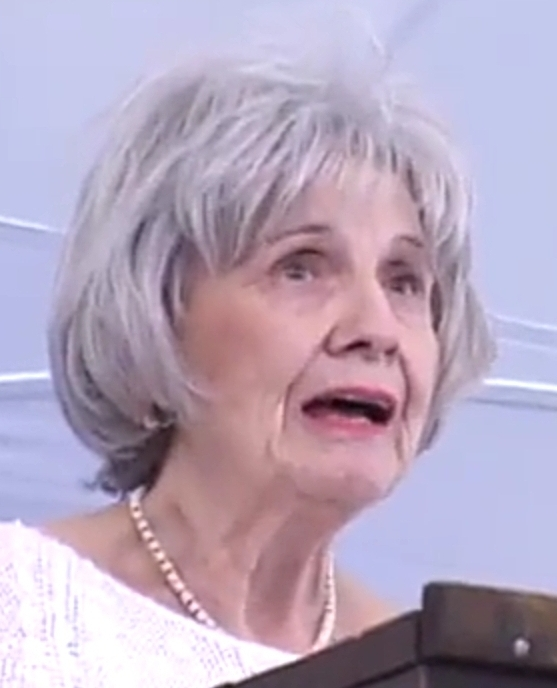
- "master of the contemporary short story."
- Date: 10 October 2013 (announcement); 10 December 2013 (ceremony)
- Location: Stockholm, Sweden
- Presented by: Swedish Academy
- First award: 1901
- Website: Official website

The 2013 Nobel Prize in Literature was awarded to the Canadian writer Alice Munro (1931–2024) as "master of the contemporary short story." She was the first Canadian and the 13th woman to receive the prize.

== Laureate ==
Alice Munro dedicated her literary career almost exclusively to the short story genre. She grew up in a small Canadian town – Huron County, Ontario – the kind of environment that often provided the backdrops for her stories. These often accommodated the entire epic complexity of the novel in just a few short pages and the underlying themes of her work were often relationship problems and moral conflicts. The relationship between memory and reality was another recurring theme she uses to create tension. With subtle means, she was able to demonstrate the impact that seemingly trivial events can have on a person's life. Her famous short story collections include Dance of the Happy Shades (1969), Who Do You Think You Are? (1978), The Progress of Love (1986), The Love of a Good Woman (1998), and Runaway (2004).

== Candidates ==
On Ladbrokes, Japanese novelist Haruki Murakami and Alice Munro were the favourites to win the 2013 Nobel Prize in Literature, followed by Svetlana Alexievich (who was subsequently awarded the 2015 Nobel Prize in Literature), Joyce Carol Oates and Péter Nádas. Other top favourites included Algerian Assia Djebar, American Thomas Pynchon, Kenyan Ngugi wa Thiong'o, Korean Ko Un and Norwegian Jon Fosse (subsequently awarded the 2023 Nobel Prize in Literature).

== Reactions ==
The choice of Alice Munro was well received. "Very few writers are her equal, she gets to the heart of what it is to be human", BBC arts editor Will Gompertz said, adding "If she hadn't won it before she died, I think it would have been a terrible, terrible omission." "This is the Nobel announcement that has made me happiest in the whole of my life" novelist A.S. Byatt said, "She has done more for the possibilities and the form of the short story than any other writer I know." "She is our Chekhov and will outlive most of her contemporaries", author Cynthia Ozick said.

== Award ceremony ==
Due to her health condition and old age, Alice Munro was not able to personally participate in the award ceremony in Stockholm. Jenny Munro, her daughter, received the diploma, medal and monetary prize from King Carl XVI Gustaf on her behalf on December 10, 2013.

Peter Englund, permanent secretary of the Swedish Academy, expressed the rightfulness of bestowing Munro the Nobel prize, by saying:

"The seemingly prosaic surface level in Alice Munro’s short stories is interwoven in an interesting way with her writing style and distinctive storytelling technique. The minimalist style we encounter is clean, transparent, subtle and stunningly precise. It is a challenge to find an unessential word or a superfluous phrase. Reading one of her texts is like watching a cat walk across a laid dinner table. A brief short story can often cover decades, summarising a life, as she moves deftly between different periods. No wonder Alice Munro is often able to say more in 30 pages than an ordinary novelist is capable of in 300. She is a virtuoso of the elliptical and – as the Academy said in its brief prize citation – the master of the contemporary short story."
