= 2010 Nobel Prize in Literature =

- Mario Vargas Llosa
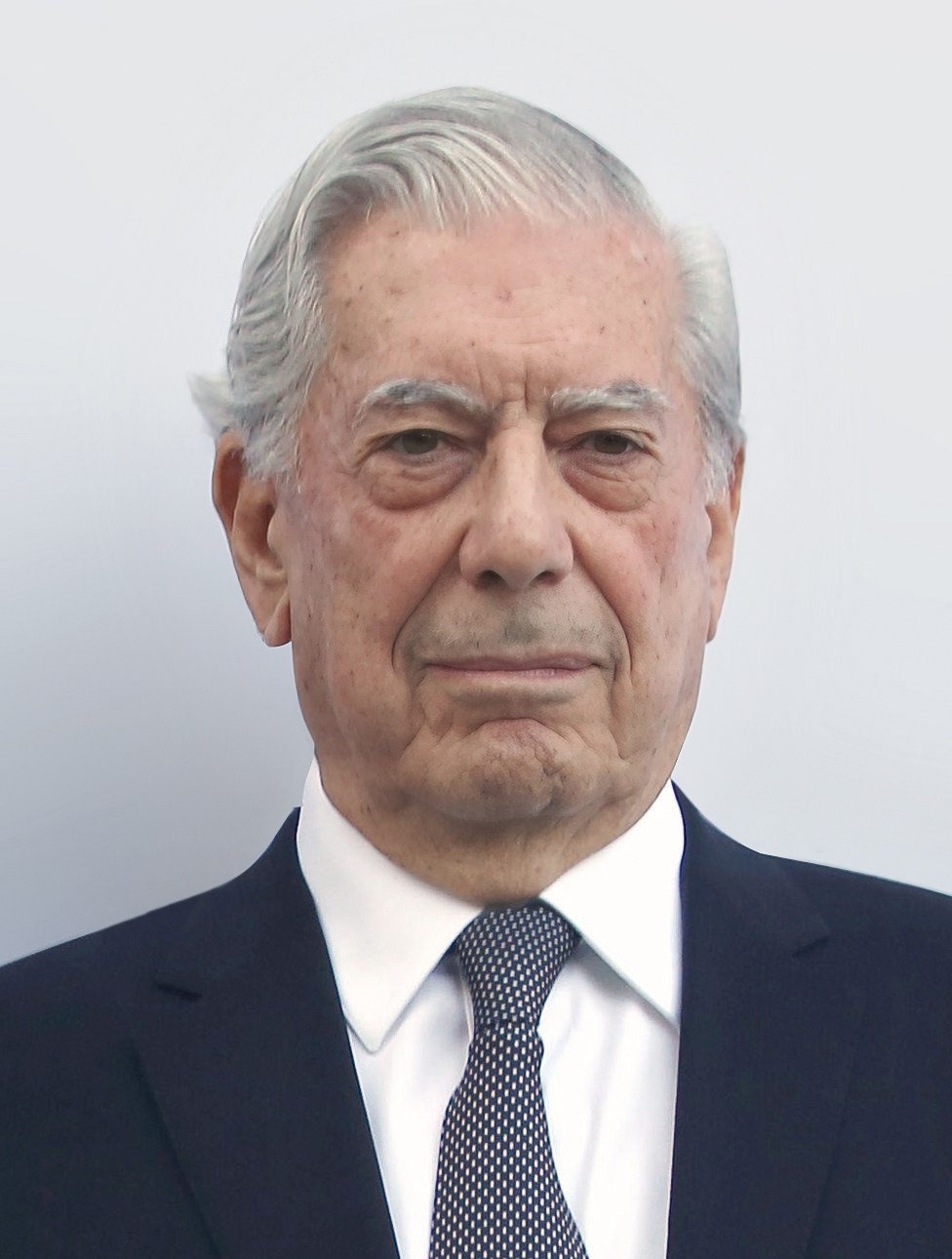
- "for his cartography of structures of power and his trenchant images of the individual's resistance, revolt, and defeat."
- Date: 7 October 2010 (announcement); 10 December 2010 (ceremony)
- Location: Stockholm, Sweden
- Presented by: Swedish Academy
- First award: 1901
- Website: Official website

The 2010 Nobel Prize in Literature was awarded to the Peruvian writer Mario Vargas Llosa (1936–2025) "for his cartography of structures of power and his trenchant images of the individual's resistance, revolt, and defeat." The prize was announced by the Swedish Academy on 7 October 2010. He is the first Nobel laureate in Literature from Peru and the fifth Latin American to become one after 1982 Colombian laureate Gabriel García Márquez and 1971 Chilean laureate Pablo Neruda.

== Laureate ==
Mario Vargas Llosa was one of the leading writers in the Latin American boom. His extensive authorship consists mostly of novels, but also of plays, essays, literary criticisms, and journalism. His major breakthroughs include La ciudad y los perros (lit. "The City and the Dogs"/trans. "The Time of the Hero", 1963), La casa verde ("The Green House", 1965), La guerra del fin del mundo ("The War of the End of the World", 1984), and the monumental Conversación en La Catedral ("Conversation in The Cathedral", 1969). His works reflect his ardent love of storytelling. They are characterized by rich language and cover a range of genres—from autobiographical books and historical novels to erotic fiction and thrillers such as La tía Julia y el escribidor ("Aunt Julia and the Scriptwriter", 1982) and Travesuras de la niña mala ("The Bad Girl", 2007). He has also won literary prizes such as the 1967 Rómulo Gallegos Prize, 1986 Prince of Asturias Award, 1994 Miguel de Cervantes Prize, and the 1995 Jerusalem Prize.

== Ladbrokes favourites ==
After 13 years of novelists and playwrights awarded the prize, Ladbrokes tipped that the 2010 Nobel Prize in Literature was going to be awarded a poet. Swedish poet Tomas Tranströmer (who was awarded the prize the following year) was the favourite to win the prize at 5/1 odds, followed by low odds also for the Polish poet Adam Zagajewski, Syrian poet Adonis, Korean poet Ko Un and Australian poet Les Murray. Possible winners at slightly higher odds included perennial favourites such as American novelists Philip Roth, Joyce Carol Oates and Thomas Pynchon, Canadians Alice Munro (awarded in 2013) and Margaret Atwood, British author A. S. Byatt, and the long time favourite Mario Vargas Llosa, who was given 25/1 odds to win the prize.

== Reactions ==
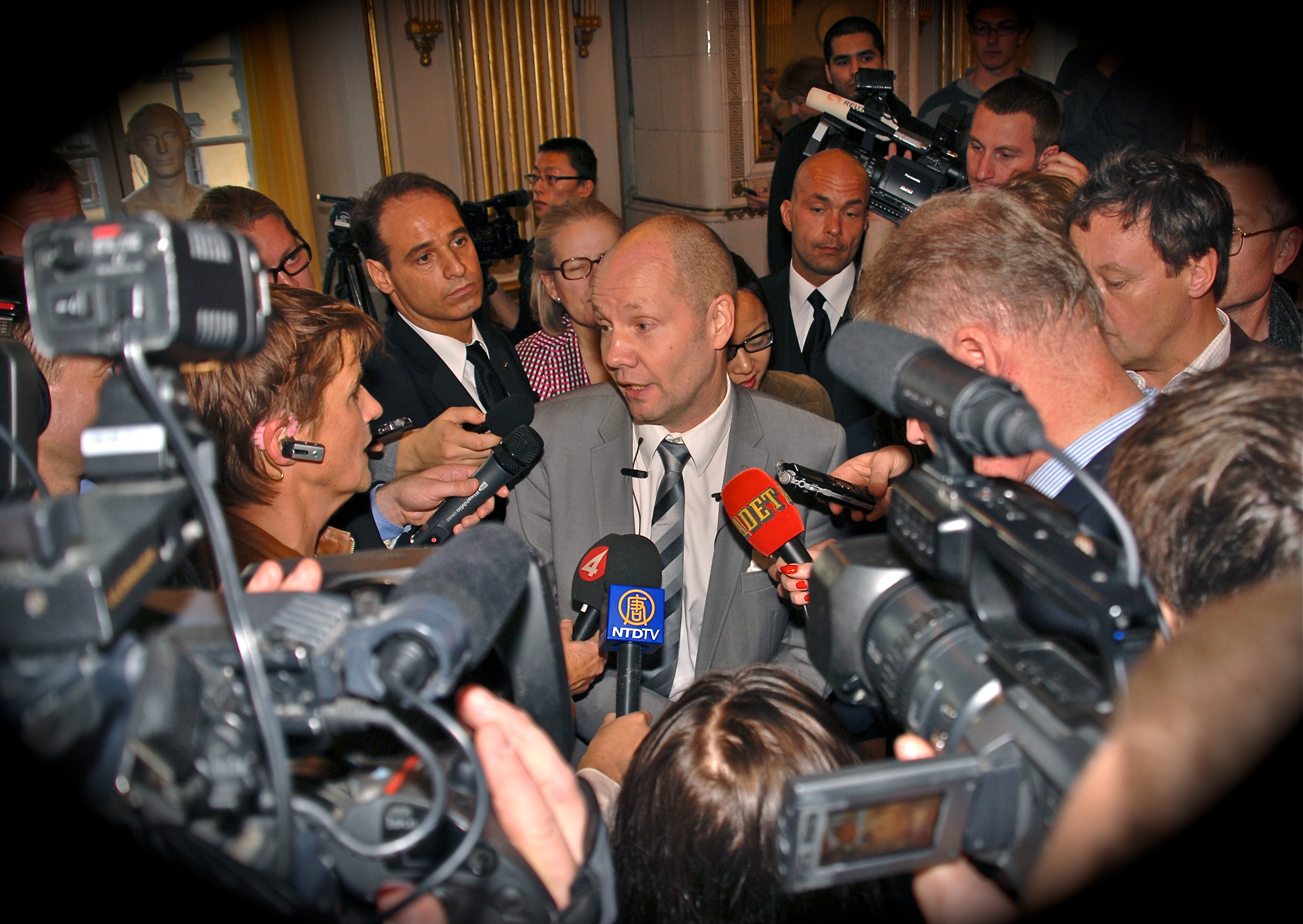
Peter Englund, the permanent secretary of the Swedish Academy, surrounded by the international media when announcing the Nobel Prize in literature 2010.

The Nobel Prize in Literature awarded to Mario Vargas Llosa was well received around the world. "The world recognizes the intelligence and the will of freedom and democracy by Vargas Llosa and it is an act of enormous justice" said Alan García, president of Peru. Spanish writer Javier Marías said "it is one of those prizes that never or almost never needs to be discussed." Novelist William Boyd paid tribute to "a great chroncicler of the highs and lows of our carnal and passionate adventures as human beings". The prize was also celebrated by Bernard Kouchner, foreign minister of France, Felipe Calderón, president of Mexico, and the King of Spain Juan Carlos, among others.

Vargas Llosa himself said he was delighted but surprised: "For years I haven't thought about the Nobel prize at all. They didn't mention me in recent years so I didn't expect it. It's been a surprise, very nice, but a surprise. At first I thought it was a joke," he told RPP Noticias.

== Nobel lecture ==
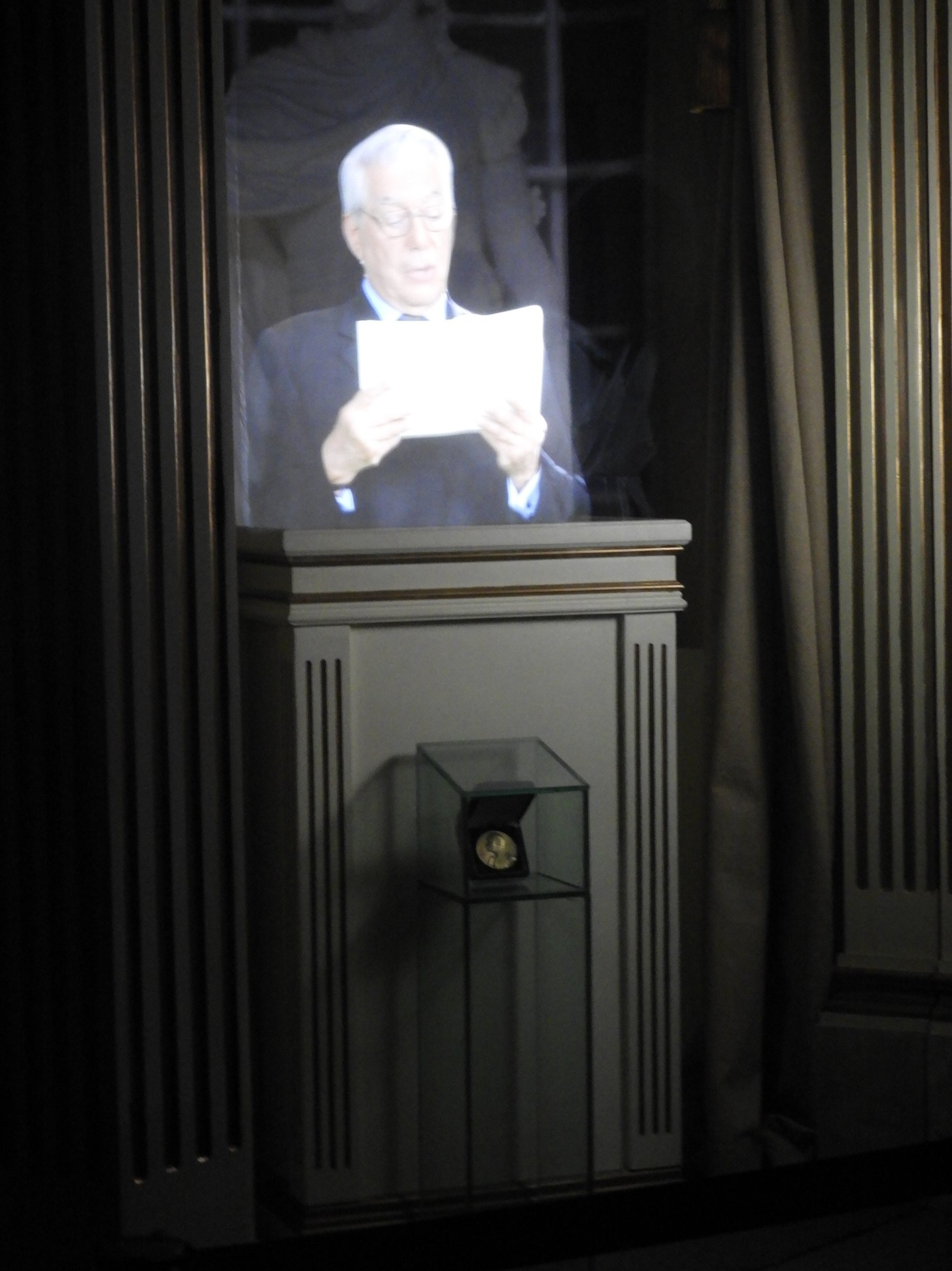

Mario Vargas Llosa delivered his Nobel lecture Elogio de la lectura y la ficción at the Swedish Academy on 7 December 2010. In it Vargas Llosa paid tribute to the power of fiction and said he believed it was essential to a healthy society. "We would be worse than we are without the good books we have read, more conformist, not as restless, more submissive, and the critical spirit, the engine of progress, would not even exist," he argued. "Like writing, reading is a protest against the insufficiencies of life. When we look in fiction for what is missing in life, we are saying, with no need to say it or even to know it, that life as it is does not satisfy our thirst for the absolute – the foundation of the human condition – and should be better."

== Award ceremony ==
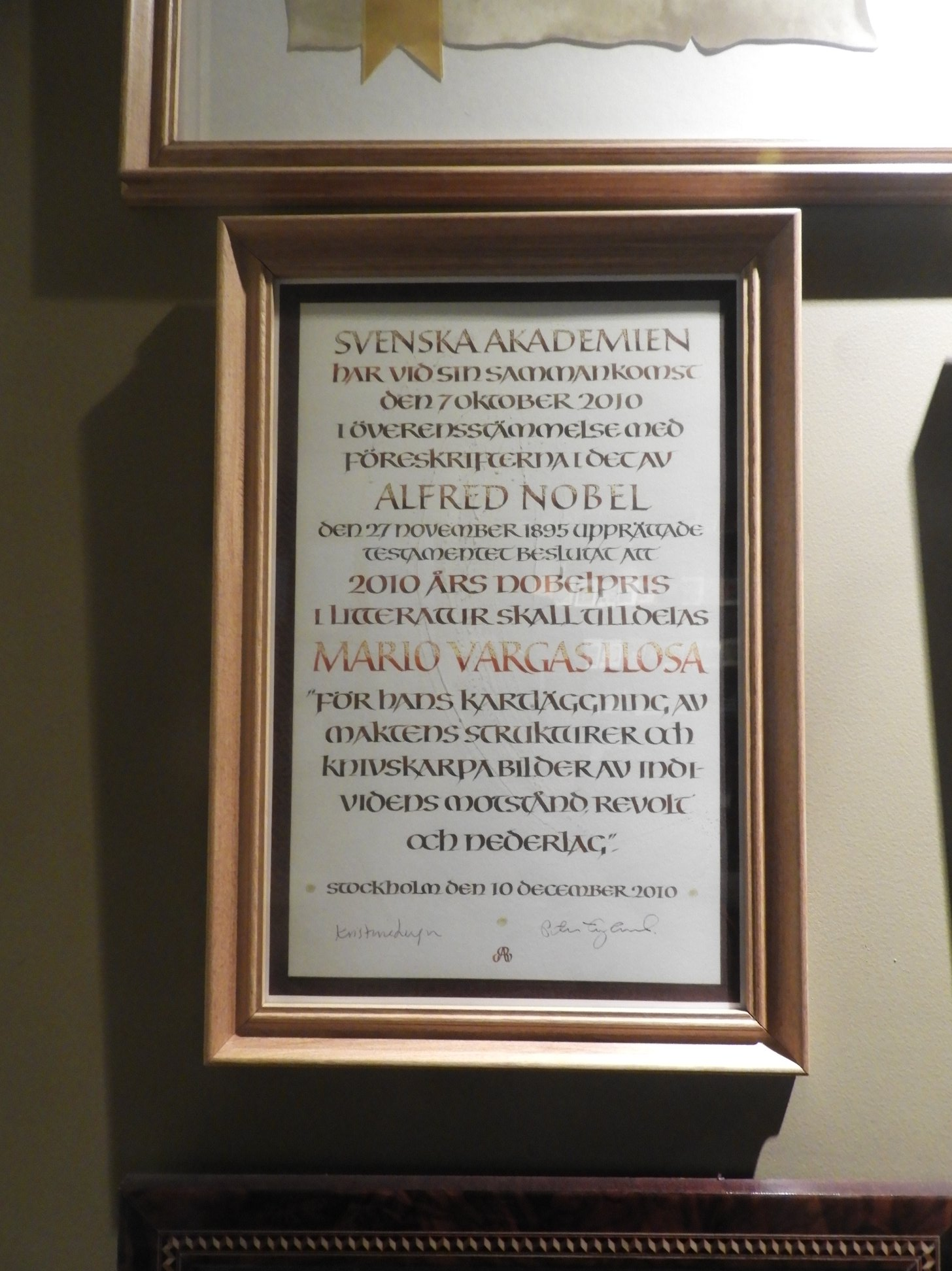
The Nobel diploma awarded to Mario Vargas Llosa

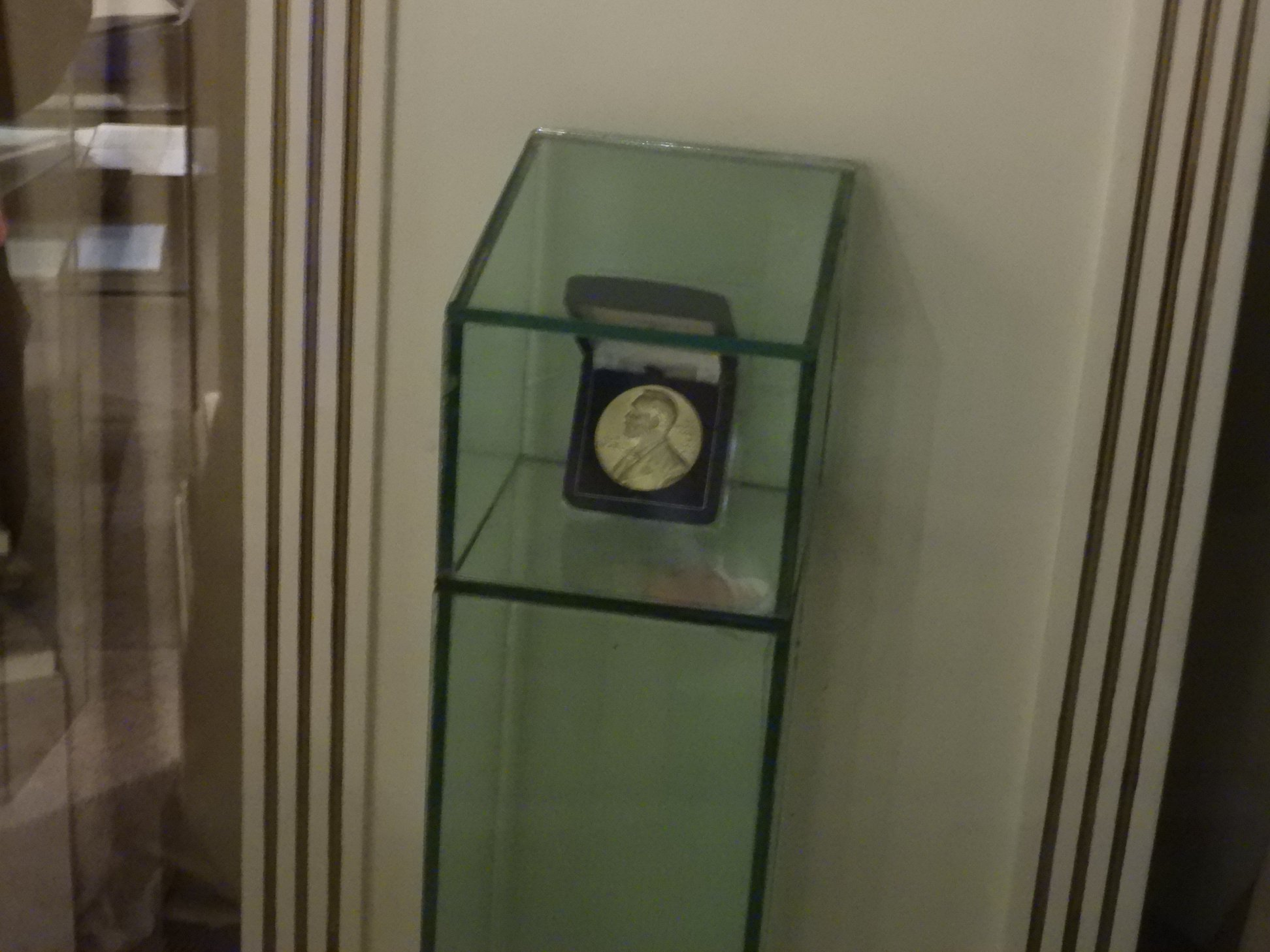
The Nobel prize medal awarded to Mario Vargas Llosa.

In his award ceremony speech on 10 December 2010 Per Wästberg, member of the Swedish Academy and chairman of the Nobel committee for literature, said of Vargas Llosa:

"Mario Vargas Llosa's writing has shaped our image of South America and has its own chapter in the history of contemporary literature. In his early years, he was a renewer of the novel; today, an epic poet of not only Latin American stature. His wide embrace enfolds all literary genres.", "Vargas Llosa has led us through unfamiliar milieux with an authority that lends the authenticity of a 19th-century explorer. He links the narrative tradition of Balzac and Tolstoy to the modernistic experiments of William Faulkner."

"Vargas Llosa's novels never bow to diktat; they are polyphonic and open to interpretation, emphasising the diversity of Latin America's social and ethnic patterns. He lends voice to the silenced and oppressed – an aesthetic feat and an ethical act. He has an unreserved interest in people – from presidents to prostitutes – and nothing is alien to him, from the arrogance of statesmen to love's subtlest plots."

"Vargas Llosa believes in the force of literature. Without literature there would be no rendition of mankind's possibilities and hidden places. It is a bulwark against prejudice, racism and intolerant nationalism, since in all great literature, men and women of the entire world are equally alive. It is harder to suppress a people that reads a lot."

"So he has fought for freedom of expression and for human rights regardless of geography, and has done so with a passion for liberty and with political courage and common sense – these not always in harmony in important writers. In a time of tiresome narcissism he is what Émile Zola, André Gide and Camus embodied: an example and a bellwether."
