= Boys and Girls (short story) =

Short story by Alice Munro

"Boys and Girls" (1964/1968) is a short story by Alice Munro, the Canadian winner of the Nobel Prize in Literature in 2013 which deals with the making of gender roles.

== Synopsis ==
Whenever she shares her daily routine farmwork with her father, the young narrator is taken to be a boy by visitors. She tries to keep away from any work in her mother's range of tasks because she does not really take any interest in that kind of work. The narrator remembers that by the time she was eleven years old, she was faced with more and more expectations of what a girl should be like and what she should do or not do. Her role in the family began to change, and the narrator concludes with telling the story of an event in which she behaved according to her intuition, is squealed on by her younger brother and subsequently her father says, "She's only a girl". The narrator's last comment reads: ″Maybe it was true.″

== Architecture of the story ==
The architecture of Munro's short stories is essential for any interpretation. This story consists of three sections, with the first being the shortest and the last the longest. In this regard, there is not much of a difference between the book version and the earlier one. The story consists of roughly 17 pages.

== Publication history ==
"Boys and Girls" was originally published in 1964 and subsequently in Munro's 1968 collection of short stories, Dance of the Happy Shades.

== Adaptation ==
The CBC produced a television adaptation of "Boys and Girls" in 1983. It won an Academy Award in 1984 for Best Short Subject.
