= The Progress of Love =

Book by Alice Munro

- First edition
- Author: Alice Munro
- Language: English
- Published: Douglas Gibson Books (McClelland and Stewart), 1986
- Publication place: Canada
- Awards: Governor General's Award for English-language fiction (1986)
- ISBN: 0-7710-6666-X
- Preceded by: The Moons of Jupiter
- Followed by: Friend of My Youth

The Progress of Love is a book of short stories by Alice Munro, published by McClelland and Stewart in 1986. It won the 1986 Governor General's Award for English Fiction, her third win of that award.

The book was originally contracted to Macmillan of Canada, the publisher of Munro's previous two books. However, when editor Douglas Gibson left the company to join McClelland and Stewart, Munro returned the advance that Macmillan had already paid her, so that she could continue working with Gibson at the new company rather than rebuilding a new relationship with a different editor. The book ultimately became the first title ever released under M&S's new Douglas Gibson Books imprint.

== Stories ==
- "The Progress of Love"
- "Lichen"
- "Monsieur les Deux Chapeaux"
- "Miles City, Montana"
- "Fits"
- "The Moon in the Orange Street Skating Rink"
- "Jesse and Meribeth"
- "Eskimo"
- "Queer Streak"
- "Circle of Prayer"
- "White Dump"
