= The Moons of Jupiter (book) =

Book of short stories by Alice Munro

- Cover of the first edition.
- Author: Alice Munro
- Language: English
- Publication date: 1982
- Publication place: Canada

The Moons of Jupiter is a book of short stories by Alice Munro, published by Macmillan of Canada in 1982. It was nominated for the 1982 Governor General's Award for English Fiction. The title of the collection follows from the last short story in the collection "The Moons of Jupiter".

== Stories ==
- "Chaddeleys and Flemings I: The Connection"
- "Chaddeleys and Flemings II: The Stone in the Field"
- "Dulse"
- "The Turkey Season"
- "Accident"
- "Bardon Bus"
- "Prue"
- "Labor Day Dinner"
- "Mrs. Cross and Mrs. Kidd"
- "Hard-Luck Stories"
- "Visitors"
- "The Moons of Jupiter"
