= The View from Castle Rock =

Book by Alice Munro

- Author: Alice Munro
- Language: English
- Genre: General Fiction
- Publisher: McClelland and Stewart
- Publication date: 2006
- Publication place: Canada
- Media type: Hardcover
- ISBN: 9780771065262
- Preceded by: Runaway
- Followed by: Too Much Happiness

The View from Castle Rock is a book of short stories by Canadian author Alice Munro, recipient of the 2013 Nobel Prize in Literature, which was published in 2006 by McClelland and Stewart.

The book is a collection of historical and autobiographical stories. The first part of the book narrates the lives of members of the Laidlaw branch of the family tree of the author, starting from their Scottish origins in the 18th century. The second part consists of fictionalized tales inspired by events in her own life.

== Contents ==
- Foreword
- Part One / No Advantages
  - "No Advantages"
  - "The View from Castle Rock"
  - "Illinois"
  - "The Wilds of Morris Township"
  - "Working for a Living"
- Part Two / Home
  - "Fathers"
  - "Lying Under the Apple Tree"
  - "Hired Girl"
  - "The Ticket"
  - "Home"
  - "What Do You Want to Know For?"
- Epilogue
  - "Messenger"

== Stories ==
=== No Advantages ===
This narrative retells the lives of members of the Laidlaw family who lived in Ettrick Valley, Scotland, in the 18th century. The title comes from the judgment by the Statistical Account of Scotland in 1799 that This parish possesses no advantages. Will O'Phaup was a mythical man, who was a prodigious runner, a bootlegger, and a heavy drinker; he had encounters with fairies and ghosts. Thomas Boston was the local presbyterian preacher at the same time; he wrote on matters of faith, he was obsessed with religious guilt, his ideas were borderline heretical, he had a very hard life. James Hogg and James Laidlaw were cousins; Hogg became a poet and friend of Walter Scott, while Laidlaw was a man of modern ideas but traditional mentality, who was obsessed with going to America, where he eventually took his family when he was already in his old age.

=== The View from Castle Rock ===
This story narrates the voyage of James Laidlaw and his family to Canada. The title stems from the event when James took his ten-year-old child Andrew to the top of the Rock of Edinburgh Castle to show him the coast of America (actually Fife). James Laidlaw (Old James) had one daughter, Mary, and 5 sons, Robert, James, Andrew, William, and Walter. Robert and William had moved to the Highlands before the move, while the others followed in the voyage (although James has left earlier). Andrew's family is composed of his pregnant wife Agnes and their infant son (Young) James. Agnes gives birth to a girl during the ocean crossing. Mary is very attached to Young James: she takes care of him and panics when he disappears. Young James dies shortly after their landing. Walter writes down an account of the trip in his journal. He meets a rich girl suffering from tuberculosis; her father suggests he follow them and get a job in his business, but Walter refuses.

=== Illinois ===
William Laidlaw also moves to America, specifically to the town of Joliet, Illinois. He is the most forward-looking of Old James' children. He wants to break with his roots and start a completely new life with his wife Mary. But he dies of cholera and his wife and children are taken to Canada by Andrew Laidlaw. The oldest of the children, Jamie, steals his newborn sister Jane and tries to direct the blame on a half-Indian neighbor. This is a plot to keep the family in their home, but it fails. The youngest of William's sons, Thomas, is the author's great-grandfather.

=== Working for a Living ===
This story is about Alice Munro's father. As a teenager, he shunned the peasant life of his parents and passed time in the bush hunting and trapping. This led in his adult life to a business of raising fur animals, especially silver foxes and mink. During the war, when Alice was a young girl, the business started to go bad, but was saved by the mother who managed to sell their furs to American tourists. Eventually they had to give up the enterprise and the father found a job in a foundry.

=== Fathers ===
The author recalls the days of school and specifically the relationship with two schoolmates, Dahlia Newcombe and Frances Wainwright. The figures of their fathers are compared with Alice Munro's own father. Dahlia's dad was a violent man who regularly beat his children and wife. Mr. Wainwright was a gentle person belonging to the Salvation Army. Alice's father was severe and sometimes used corporal punishment, but never out of anger and without a reason.

=== Lying Under the Apple Tree ===
A neighbor of Alice Munro's family, Miriam McAlpin, kept horses. Apparently she loved horses more than people. The young Alice one day entered the property to lie under her blossoming apple trees, to satisfy a literary fancy. She was discovered and accused of going there with a boyfriend.

Later she started her first romantic relation with the stable boy, Russell Craik. One day he takes her to the barn but Miriam enters it. Alice leaves in secret but overhears something and understands that the two have an intimate relationship.

She never sees Russell again.

=== Hired Girl ===
It is the chronicle of a summer passed as a servant on an island for a rich family. The persons she meets there are the origins of the girl's literary fantasies.

=== The Ticket ===
Just before her first wedding, the narrator has the occasion to reflect upon the marriages of other women in her family. It seems that Aunt Charlie is the only one who married for love. Surprisingly, this same aunt gives the narrator a big amount of money to get out of her marriage in case it doesn't work out.

=== Home ===
On a visit home after the end of her marriage, the narrator has to take her father to the hospital. He has remarried after the death of her mother, and the new wife Irlma is an energetic woman who claims that she was always the right woman for him.

=== What Do You Want to Know For? ===
After she married for the second time, at the age of sixty, Alice Munro has a health scare: she may have breast cancer. At the same time she and her husband are trying to trace the origin of an unusual crypt they find in an old cemetery. They find out that it was originally built for the body of a small child in the 19th century, and that later other members of the same family were buried there. A curious fact is that a desk with a bible and a lamp were left inside the crypt. Eventually it turns out that the cancer scare was uncertain.

=== Messenger ===
In the present, the author travels to Joliet, Illinois, where her ancestor William Laidlaw died. She finds an Unknown Cemetery, but can't find any trace of him. The book closes with the oldest memories of living members of the family. In one of their houses Alice, as a child, could put her ear to a big mother-of-pearl seashell and hear the sound of the sea and her blood.
