= Open Secrets (short story collection) =

Book of short stories by Alice Munro

- First edition cover
- Author: Alice Munro
- Genre: Short story collection
- Publisher: McClelland & Stewart
- Publication date: September 26, 1994
- ISBN: 0-679-43575-1

Open Secrets (ISBN 0-099-45971-X) is a book of short stories by Alice Munro published by McClelland and Stewart in 1994. It was nominated for the 1994 Governor General's Award for English Fiction.

The Edmonton Journal called it "the best Canadian book of 1994." In a starred review, Kirkus Reviews wrote, "In Munro's hands, fact is a stepsister to fiction and reality may have nothing in common with life's truths. Storytelling made essential by one of the true pros."

== Stories ==
- "Carried Away"
- "A Real Life"
- "The Albanian Virgin"
- "Open Secrets"
- "The Jack Randa Hotel"
- "A Wilderness Station"
- "Spaceships Have Landed"
- "Vandals"
