= Douglas Gibson =

Canadian editor, publisher and writer

- Born: Douglas Maitland Gibson; December 4, 1943 (age 82); Kilmarnock, Ayrshire, Scotland
- Education: University of St Andrews; Yale University
- Occupations: editor, publisher, memoirist
- Known for: Douglas Gibson Books, Stories About Storytellers

Douglas Maitland Gibson, C.M. (born December 4, 1943) is a Canadian editor, publisher and writer. Best known as the former president and publisher of McClelland and Stewart, he was particularly noted for his professional relationships with many of Canada's most prominent and famous writers.

Born in Kilmarnock, Ayrshire, Scotland and raised in the nearby village of Dunlop, Gibson attended the University of St. Andrews and Yale University before moving to Canada in 1967. He worked briefly for McMaster University before being hired as a junior editor at Doubleday Canada, where his first job was editing a biography of Stephen Leacock.

In 1974 he became editorial director of Macmillan of Canada, ascending to publisher of the company in 1979. During his time at Macmillan, Gibson sent first-time authors an instructional guide, "What Happens After My Book Is Published?", which was published by Saturday Night in 1979 and was nominated for a National Magazine Award for humor. With MacMillan, he was noted for successfully negotiating Mavis Gallant's first Canadian publishing deal; Gallant, a Canadian writer who had spent much of her life and career living in Paris, France as an expatriate, was not considered to be well known in the Canadian market and did not even have a Canadian publisher at all until Gibson approached her. He also spearheaded the creation and publication of Home Truths, a compilation of Gallant's Canadian-themed stories which was her only title ever to win the Governor General's Award for English-language fiction. Robertson Davies, Bruce Hutchison, Jack Hodgins, Alice Munro and Morley Callaghan were also among the writers who established relationships with Gibson in this era.

In the early 1980s, he also contributed film reviews to CBC Radio's Sunday Morning. Throughout his career, he has also been a contributor to The Globe and Mail, the National Post, Books in Canada, Toronto Life and Maclean's.

He moved to McClelland and Stewart in 1986, becoming publisher of the company in 1988 and president in 2000. With M&S, he also managed his own imprint, Douglas Gibson Books. Numerous authors, including Munro, Davies, Hodgins, Gallant, Hugh MacLennan, Donald Jack, Guy Vanderhaeghe and W.O. Mitchell, followed him from Macmillan to M&S in order to continue working with him. Munro returned the advance the company had already paid her for The Progress of Love, and had to enter several months of legal negotiations to get released from her contract, although The Progress of Love ultimately became the first title published by Douglas Gibson Books. The departures greatly damaged Macmillan, which published only a small and irregular selection of fiction titles after Gibson's departure.

Gibson was awarded the Canadian Booksellers' Association President's Award in 1991. In 2017 he was awarded membership in the Order of Canada.

Following his retirement in 2008, Gibson published a memoir, Stories About Storytellers: Publishing Alice Munro, Robertson Davies, Alistair MacLeod, Pierre Trudeau, and Others, in 2011. Munro wrote the book's introduction. He also made frequent public appearances and statements on behalf of Munro, whose declining health prevented her from making many public engagements.

== Douglas Gibson Books ==
Gibson retired from his primary role with M&S, but he continued to hold the role of publisher emeritus with Douglas Gibson Books.

Works published by Douglas Gibson Books have included short story collections by Alice Munro and Mavis Gallant, Terry Fallis' novels The Best Laid Plans and The High Road, Paul Wells' Right Side Up: The Fall of Paul Martin and the Rise of Stephen Harper's New Conservatism, Yves Beauchemin's A Very Bold Leap and The Years of Fire, James Bartleman's memoir Raisin Wine: A Boyhood in a Different Muskoka, and Max Nemni and Monique Nemni's series of biographies of Pierre Trudeau.
