= Dear Life (Munro book) =

2012 short story collection by Alice Munro

- First edition
- Author: Alice Munro
- Language: English
- Genre: Short story collection
- Publisher: McClelland and Stewart
- Publication place: Canada
- Media type: Print (hardcover)
- ISBN: 978-0143180661

Dear Life is a short story collection by Canadian writer Alice Munro, published in 2012 by McClelland and Stewart.

The book was to have been promoted in part by a reading at Toronto's International Festival of Authors, although the appearance was cancelled due to health concerns.

== Publication history ==
Most of the stories collected in Dear Life had previously been published elsewhere. "Amundsen", "Corrie", "Dear Life", "Gravel", "Haven" and "Leaving Maverley" were all originally published in The New Yorker. "Dolly" was first published in Tin House.

== Critical reception ==
Kate Kellaway in The Guardian describes these stories as "concise, subtle and masterly" noting that they have a "subtle, unshowy, covert brilliance".

Ruth Scurr, writing in The Telegraph, points to the autobiographical aspect of the collection and declares the collection to be "a subversive challenge to the idea of autobiography: a purposeful melding of fact fiction and feeling". The reviewer goes on to suggest the collection might be Munro's last, but if so would be a "spectacular" finale.

Munro won the Nobel Prize in Literature in October 2013 for the body of work over her lifetime.
