= Suleiman Cassamo =

Mozambican writer

Suleiman Cassamo (born 2 November 1962 in Marracuene) is a Mozambican writer. He is a member of Associação dos Escritores Moçambicanos.

He studied Mechanical engineering and has published in Charrua, Gazeta de Artes e Letras, Eco, Forja and Notícias.

== Works ==
- O regresso do morto, 1987
- Amor de Baobá, 1997
- Palestra para Um Morto, 1999

== Awards ==
- Prémio Guimarães Rosa, Radio France Internacionale:O Caminho de Phati (1994).

== Sources and external links ==
- Associação dos Escritores Moçambicanos Contracapa da obra O regresso do morto
- Biblioteca Nacional de Portugal Porbase
