= Who Do You Think You Are? (book) =

Book of short stories by Alice Munro

- First edition
- Author: Alice Munro
- Language: English
- Genre: Literary fiction, Short story cycle
- Publisher: Macmillan of Canada
- Publication date: 1978
- Publication place: Canada
- Media type: Print (hardback & paperback)
- Pages: 206 pp (hardcover edition) & 272 pp (paperback edition)
- ISBN: 978-0-7705-1712-0 (hardcover edition)
- OCLC: 5099798
- Dewey Decimal: 813/.5/4
- LC Class: PZ4.M969 Wh PR9199.3.M8

Who Do You Think You Are? is a book of short stories by Alice Munro, recipient of the 2013 Nobel Prize in Literature, published by Macmillan of Canada in 1978. It won Munro her second Governor General's Award for Fiction in English, and short-listed for the Booker Prize for Fiction in 1980 under its international title, The Beggar Maid (subtitled Stories of Flo and Rose).

The book has received significant critical attention. It has been described as an eminent example of the integrated short fiction cycle, with some early critics going so far as to suggest that the stories might constitute a novel. Others have argued that the tension between the larger scale structure of the book and the individual nature of the stories is essential to Munro's sophisticated literary fiction.

== Stories ==
- "Royal Beatings"
- "Privilege"
- "Half a Grapefruit"
- "Wild Swans"
- "The Beggar Maid"
- "Mischief"
- "Providence"
- "Simon's Luck"
- "Spelling"
- "Who Do You Think You Are?"

== Summary ==
As suggested by the title, the theme of identity is central to the collection. It could be described in relation to the tradition of Bildungsroman, but

As a text about aging into midlife, Who Do You Think You Are? does more than simply range beyond the “season of youth” that is the traditional preserve of the Bildungsroman [...]; it draws attention to age itself as something of an unremarked category in a form ostensibly concerned with getting older.

The central figure of the cycle, Rose, grows up in a small town, abused by her father, and living in an impoverished home.

In "Half a Grapefruit", Rose begins attending a school in the more affluent part of town. In class, when asked what she ate for breakfast, she lies and says "half a grapefruit" rather than revealing her mundane, considerably less glamorous meal. The lie haunts her, and she is embarrassed by her upbringing.

Rose ends up winning a scholarship to attend university. On a train ride to Toronto, she is molested by a clergyman; she chooses to ignore this incident, but it has irreparable damage on her future relationships with men. At university she meets her husband who has a medieval perspective of women—he is drawn to her because he sees her as a damsel in distress. Her marriage eventually ends, and she has to juggle being a mother, meeting other men, and her acting career.

One of her significant relationships is with Simon, a charming man she meets at a friend's house. The two spend the weekend together, and she grows attached to him (she describes it as developing an understanding for Simon's many personas). He disappears unexpectedly afterwards. She later discovers that Simon has died.

The final few short stories have her returning home; this gives her a chance to close the chapter of her life involving her complicated relationship with her stepmother, Flo.
