= Friend of My Youth =

Book by Alice Munro

- First edition cover
- Author: Alice Munro
- Publisher: McClelland & Stewart
- Publication date: March 23, 1990
- ISBN: 0-679-72957-7

Friend of My Youth is a book of short stories by Alice Munro, published by McClelland and Stewart in 1990. It won the 1990 Trillium Book Award.

== Stories ==
- "Friend of My Youth"
- "Five Points"
- "Meneseteung"
- "Hold Me Fast, Don't Let Me Pass"
- "Oranges and Apples"
- "Pictures of the Ice"
- "Goodness and Mercy"
- "Oh, What Avails"
- "Differently"
- "Wigtime"

== "Friend of My Youth" ==
"Friend of My Youth," the title story, largely consists of a reminiscence of the narrator about the family her now-deceased mother boarded with before her marriage.

== "Five Points" ==
"Five Points," the second story, is about a married woman, Brenda, in Ontario having an affair. Her boyfriend, Neil, tells her about a confectionery he frequented in his youth in Victoria, British Columbia, and its owners.

== "Meneseteung" ==
"Meneseteung" starts with a description of Almeda Joynt Roth's book of poems from 1873. In 1854 Almeda's family had moved to a part of Ontario that was being settled. Her father's business was doing well and the family had a comfortable home. By 1860, Almeda's sister, brother, and mother had died. Almeda's father died in 1872. The unnamed narrator talks about Roth's life. In 1879, she continued to live alone in the family home. Later we learn of Jarvis Poulter, a widower, who has recently moved into a home near Roth. Poulter would like to marry Roth, yet they do not marry. Less than a year after Roth dies, Poulter passes away.

== "Hold Me Fast, Don't Let Me Pass" ==
"Hold Me Fast, Don't Let Me Pass" is the story of Hazel Curtis travels to Scotland, telling people that it was a trip she and her late husband wanted to take. Except her late husband, Jack, did not want to take the trip. While in Scotland, she meets Dudley Brown. Through the story, we learn that Jack had many loves in his life and yet war broke him. For Brown, he also has many romantic interests. Brown finds his way through life by giving the women he can romance a form of happiness.

== "Oranges and Apples" ==
The title, "Oranges and Apples," refers to a game of choice. As one of the main characters, Barbara Zeigler, explains, the game begins with easy choices that grow progressively more challenging. When reading the story, it's clear that Barbara, along with her husband, Murray, and Murray's friend, Victor Sawicky, make choices akin to the game. For example, Murray decides between being a minister and running his father's department store. Barbara and Victor are notable attractive individuals. Murray is concerned that Barbara prefers Victor. Victor does not want to be with Barbara as is the wife of his best friend, Murray.

== Literature ==
- Lynn Blin, Alice Munro’s Naughty Coordinators in “Friend of My Youth”, in: Journal of the Short Story in English (JSSE)/Les cahiers de la nouvelle, ISSN 0294-0442, n° 55 (Autumn 2010), Special issue: The Short Stories of Alice Munro.
- Deborah Heller, Getting Loose: Women and Narration in Alice Munro's Friend of my Youth, in: The rest of the story. Critical essays on Alice Munro, edited by Robert Thacker, ECW Press, Toronto 1999, ISBN 1-55022-392-5, pp. 60–80.
