= Dance of the Happy Shades =

1968 short story collection by Alice Munro

- First edition
- Author: Alice Munro
- Language: English
- Genre: Short story collection
- Publisher: Ryerson Press
- Publication date: 1968
- Publication place: Canada
- Pages: xi, 224 pages (1st edition)
- Awards: 1968 Governor General's Award
- ISBN: 0-099-27377-2

Dance of the Happy Shades is a book of short stories by Alice Munro, published by Ryerson Press in 1968. It was her first collection of stories and won the 1968 Governor General's Award for English Fiction. The title of the main story is the English translation provided for the ballet in Gluck's Orfeo ed Euridice when it was first presented in London.

== Stories ==
- "Walker Brothers Cowboy"
- "The Shining Houses"
- "Images"
- "Thanks for the Ride"
- "The Office"
- "An Ounce of Cure"
- "The Time of Death"
- "Day of the Butterfly"
- "Boys and Girls"
- "Postcard"
- "Red Dress—1946"
- "Sunday Afternoon"
- "A Trip to the Coast"
- "The Peace of Utrecht"
- "Dance of the Happy Shades"
