= Lives of Girls and Women =

1971 book by Alice Munro

- Author: Alice Munro
- Genre: Bildungsroman
- Publisher: McGraw-Hill Ryerson
- Publication date: 1971
- Pages: 254 pp.
- ISBN: 978-0-07-092932-6
- OCLC: 517102

Lives of Girls and Women is a novel by Nobel Prize–winning Canadian author Alice Munro, published by McGraw-Hill Ryerson in 1971. Although described and marketed as a novel, in form it resembles a collection of interlinked short stories, with discrete chapters narrated by the main character, Del Jordan.

The novel is a coming of age story for Del Jordan growing up first on the outskirts, and later in the centre, of the small, southern Ontario town of Jubilee. Del is portrayed as something of an outsider, unsatisfied with small-town life though unwilling to acknowledge the similarities between herself and her mother who also seeks to expand her mind beyond the limited experiences of Jubilee.

The novel is often cited as concerning many feminist ideas and it is in this context that the text deals primarily with female characters, with only a few male figures playing important roles.

== Adaptation ==
A television adaptation of the book, starring Tanya Allen as Del and Wendy Crewson as her mother Ada, aired on CBC Television in 1994.

== Stories ==
"The Flats Road" "Heirs of the Living Body" "Princess Ida" "Age of Faith" "Changes and Ceremonies" "Lives of Girls and Women" "Baptizing" "Epilogue: The Photographer"
