= Alice Munro =

Canadian short story writer (1931–2024)

Alice Munro OOnt
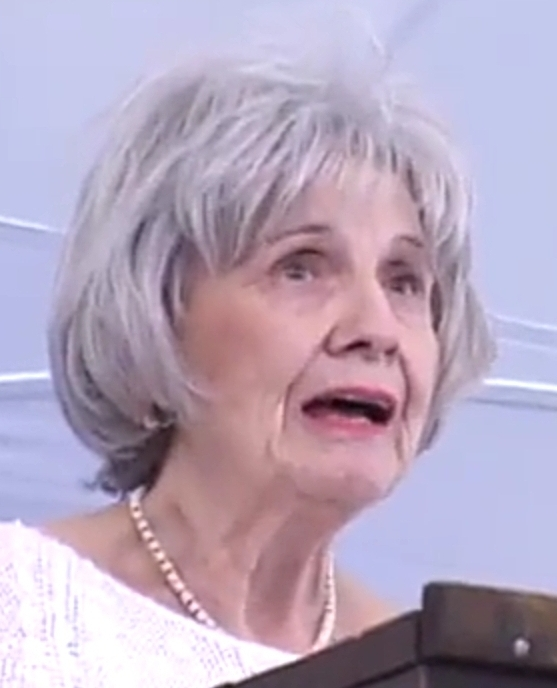
- Munro in 2006
- Born: Alice Ann Laidlaw; 10 July 1931; Wingham, Ontario, Canada
- Died: 13 May 2024 (aged 92); Port Hope, Ontario, Canada
- Education: University of Western Ontario
- Occupation: Short story writer
- Spouses: James Munro (m. 1951; div. 1972) Gerald Fremlin (m. 1976; died 2013)
- Children: 4
- Writing career
- Language: English
- Genres: Short fiction; short story cycle; literary fiction
- Notable awards: Governor General's Award 1968, 1978, 1986; Giller Prize 1998, 2004; Man Booker International Prize 2009; Nobel Prize in Literature 2013

Alice Ann Munro OOnt (/mənˈroʊ/ mən-ROH; née Laidlaw; 10 July 1931 – 13 May 2024) was a Canadian short story writer who was awarded the Nobel Prize in Literature in 2013. Her work tends to move forward and backward in time, with integrated short story cycles.

Munro's fiction is most often set in her native Huron County in southwestern Ontario. Her stories explore human complexities in a simple but meticulous prose style. Munro received the Man Booker International Prize in 2009 for her life's work. She was also a three-time winner of Canada's Governor General's Award for Fiction, and received the Writers' Trust of Canada's 1996 Marian Engel Award and the 2004 Rogers Writers' Trust Fiction Prize for Runaway. She stopped writing around 2013 and died at her home in 2024.

Two months after Munro died, her daughter Andrea Skinner revealed that Munro's second husband, Gerald Fremlin, had sexually abused Skinner as a child starting in 1976. Munro learned of the abuse in 1992 and chose to stay with Fremlin. The news has led to some reevaluation of Munro's legacy.

== Personal life ==
=== Early life ===
Munro was born Alice Ann Laidlaw in rural Wingham, Ontario, in 1931, during the Great Depression. Her father, Robert Eric Laidlaw, was a fox and mink farmer, and later turned to turkey farming. Her mother, Anne Clarke Laidlaw (née Chamney), was a schoolteacher. Munro's family was of Irish and Scottish descent, and the Scottish poet James Hogg was an indirect ancestor. Munro's mother was controlling, which worsened as she developed Parkinson's disease in the early 1940s. In her youth, Munro often received disciplinary beatings from her father at her mother's request.

Munro began writing as a teenager, publishing her first story, "The Dimensions of a Shadow", in 1950 while studying English and journalism at the University of Western Ontario on a two-year scholarship. During this period she worked as a waitress, a tobacco picker, and a library clerk.

=== First marriage ===
In 1951, Munro left the university, where she had been majoring in English since 1949, to marry fellow student James Munro. They moved to Dundarave, West Vancouver, for James' job in a department store.

Their daughters Sheila, Catherine, and Jenny were born in 1953, 1955, and 1957, respectively; Catherine died the day of her birth due to a kidney dysfunction. In September 1966, their youngest daughter, Andrea Robin, was born.

When the children were still young, Munro tried to write whenever she could; her husband encouraged her by sending her into the bookshop while he looked after the children and cooked. In 1961, after she had published a few stories in small magazines, the Vancouver Sun ran a brief article on her, titled "Housewife Finds Time to Write Short Stories", and called her the "least praised good writer". She found it difficult, even with her husband's help, to find the time among "the pileup of unavoidable household jobs" to write, and found it easier to concentrate on short stories than on the novels her publisher wanted her to write.

In 1963, the Munros moved to Victoria, where they opened Munro's Books, a popular bookstore that remains in business.

=== Divorce and second marriage ===
Munro disliked the couple's suburban life in Victoria, later calling it "very tightly managed as a series of permitted recreations, permitted opinions and permitted ways of being a woman". Their relationship struggled, and both were unfaithful to each other. Alice and James Munro divorced in 1972.

Munro returned to Ontario to become writer in residence at the University of Western Ontario, and in 1976, received an honorary LLD from the institution. In 1976, she married Gerald Fremlin, a retired cartographer and geographer she had first met during her university days. Fremlin, a Royal Canadian Air Force veteran who had served in World War II, was also from rural Ontario, and the two bonded over their shared background. They moved to a farm outside Clinton, Ontario, and later to a house in Clinton, where Fremlin died on 17 April 2013, aged 88. Munro and Fremlin also owned a home in Comox, British Columbia.

Several of Munro's close contacts have characterized Fremlin as abusive. Jenny Munro said that Fremlin argued with Munro's friends "to isolate her". Sheila Munro called their relationship "volatile" and said Fremlin groomed Munro to see her daughter Andrea as a sexual rival. Munro's longtime friend Margaret Atwood said Munro was deeply dependent on Fremlin. At forty-four, Munro, who couldn't drive, had to rely on Gerry for transportation. She sometimes separated from Fremlin in the summers, but always returned to him.

In 2002, Sheila Munro published a childhood memoir, Lives of Mothers and Daughters: Growing Up with Alice Munro.

In 2009, Munro revealed that she had been treated for cancer and for a heart condition requiring coronary artery bypass surgery.

Munro died at her home in Port Hope, Ontario, on 13 May 2024, at age 92. She had had dementia for at least 12 years.

=== Child sexual abuse by second husband ===
On 7 July 2024, shortly after Munro's death, her youngest daughter, Andrea Skinner (née Robin) wrote in an essay in the Toronto Star that her stepfather, Gerald Fremlin, had sexually abused her starting in 1976 when she was nine years old and ending when she was a teenager. She told Munro about the abuse in 1992. After learning of the abuse, Munro separated from Fremlin for a few months, but ultimately returned to him. According to Skinner, Munro said that she had been "told too late", loved her husband too much, and wanted to stay with him. In 2002, Skinner cut off contact with Alice Munro after Alice objected to Skinner not wanting Fremlin near her own children. In 2005, Fremlin pleaded guilty to sexual assault and received a suspended sentence and two years' probation. Other family members continued regular contact with Alice Munro and Gerald Fremlin, while Skinner became estranged from all of them until after Alice's death.

Articles in The New York Times, The New Yorker, and The New Republic note that many of Munro's stories written afterward deal with child abuse, such as "Vandals", in which a woman vandalizes the house of a couple where the man molested her as a child, and "Dimension", in which a woman defends her desire to keep making jail visits to the husband who killed their three children.

Munro's biographer Robert Thacker was aware of the allegations, but did not mention them in his 2005 biography of her, though Skinner contacted him with her story shortly before it was published. Others had worked with Munro and were aware of Skinner's experience, but did not make it public. This included Douglas Gibson, Munro's editor and publisher. In her 2026 memoir, Margaret Atwood wrote that she knew nothing of the abuse until the scandal broke. Lawyer Robert Morris, who prosecuted Fremlin in his 2005 conviction, theorized that Fremlin's abuse went unreported for so long because "everyone was protecting the mother".

== Career ==
Munro's first collection of stories, Dance of the Happy Shades (1968), won the Governor General's Award, then Canada's highest literary prize. That success was followed by Lives of Girls and Women (1971), a collection of interlinked stories. In 1978, Munro's collection of interlinked stories Who Do You Think You Are? was published. This book earned Munro a second Governor General's Literary Award and was shortlisted for the Booker Prize for Fiction in 1980 under its international title, The Beggar Maid.

From 1979 to 1982, Munro toured Australia, China and Scandinavia for public appearances and readings. In 1980, she held the position of writer in residence at both the University of British Columbia and the University of Queensland.

From the 1980s to 2012, Munro published a short story collection at least once every four years. First versions of Munro's stories appeared in journals such as The Atlantic Monthly, Grand Street, Harper's Magazine, Mademoiselle, The New Yorker, Narrative Magazine, and The Paris Review. Her collections have been translated into 13 languages. In 2013, Munro was awarded the Nobel Prize in Literature, cited as a "master of the contemporary short story". She was the first Canadian and the 13th woman to receive the Nobel Prize in Literature.

Munro had a longtime association with editor and publisher Douglas Gibson. When Gibson left Macmillan of Canada in 1986 to launch the Douglas Gibson Books imprint at McClelland & Stewart, Munro returned the advance Macmillan had paid her for The Progress of Love so that she could follow Gibson to the new company. When Gibson published his memoirs in 2011, Munro wrote the introduction, and Gibson often made public appearances on Munro's behalf when her health prevented her from appearing personally.

Almost 20 of Munro's works have been made available for free on the web, in most cases only the first versions. From the period before 2003, 16 stories have been included in Munro's own compilations more than twice, with two of her works scoring four republications: "Carried Away" and "Hateship, Friendship, Courtship, Loveship, Marriage".

Film adaptations of Munro's short stories include Martha, Ruth and Edie (1988), Edge of Madness (2002), Away from Her (2006), Hateship, Loveship (2013) and Julieta (2016).

== Writing ==
Many of Munro's stories are set in Huron County, Ontario. Strong regional focus is one of her fiction's features. Asked after she won the Nobel Prize, "What can be so interesting in describing small town Canadian life?", she replied: "You just have to be there." Another feature is an omniscient narrator. Many compare her small-town settings to those of writers from the rural American South. Her characters often confront deep-rooted customs and traditions. Much of her work exemplifies the Southern Ontario Gothic literary subgenre.

A frequent theme of her work, especially her early stories, is the girl coming of age and coming to terms with her family and small hometown. In work such as Hateship, Friendship, Courtship, Loveship, Marriage (2001) and Runaway (2004), she shifted her focus to the travails of middle-age, women alone, and the elderly. Munro's stories explore human complexities in an uncomplicated prose style. Her prose reveals the ambiguities of life: "ironic and serious at the same time", "mottoes of godliness and honor and flaming bigotry", "special, useless knowledge", "tones of shrill and happy outrage", "the bad taste, the heartlessness, the joy of it". Her style juxtaposes the fantastic and the ordinary, with each undercutting the other in ways that evoke life. Robert Thacker wrote:

Munro's writing creates ... an empathetic union among readers, critics most apparent among them. We are drawn to her writing by its verisimilitude—not of mimesis, so-called and ... "realism"—but rather the feeling of being itself ... of just being a human being.

Many critics have written that Munro's stories often have the emotional and literary depth of novels. Some have asked whether Munro actually writes short stories or novels. Alex Keegan, writing in Eclectica Magazine, answered: "Who cares? In most Munro stories there is as much as in many novels."

The first PhD thesis on Munro's work was published in 1972. The first book-length volume collecting the papers presented at the University of Waterloo's first conference on her work, The Art of Alice Munro: Saying the Unsayable, was published in 1984. In 2003/2004, the journal Open Letter. The Canadian Quarterly Review of writing and sources published 14 contributions on Munro's work. In 2010, the Journal of the Short Story in English (JSSE)/Les cahiers de la nouvelle dedicated a special issue to Munro, and in 2012, an issue of the journal Narrative focused on a single story by Munro, "Passion" (2004), with an introduction, summary of the story, and five analytical essays.

=== Creating new versions ===
Munro published variant versions of her stories, sometimes within a short span of time. Her stories "Save the Reaper" and "Passion" came out in two different versions in the same year, in 1998 and 2004, respectively. Two other stories were republished in a variant version about 30 years apart, "Home" (1974/2006/2014) and "Wood" (1980/2009).

In 2006, Ann Close and Lisa Dickler Awano reported that Munro had not wanted to reread the galleys of Runaway (2004): "No, because I'll rewrite the stories." In their symposium contribution An Appreciation of Alice Munro, they say that Munro wrote eight versions of her story "Powers", for example.

Awano writes that "Wood" is a good example of how Munro, "a tireless self-editor", rewrites and revises a story, in this case returning to it for a second publication nearly 30 years later, revising characterisations, themes, and perspectives, as well as rhythmic syllables, a conjunction or a punctuation mark. The characters change, too. Inferring from the perspective they take on things, they are middle-aged in 1980, and older in 2009. Awano perceives a heightened lyricism brought about not least by the poetic precision of Munro's revision. The 2009 version has eight sections to the 1980 version's three, and a new ending. Awano writes that Munro literally "refinishes" the first take on the story with an ambiguity characteristic of her endings, and reimagines her stories throughout her work in various ways.

== Legacy ==
Munro's work has been described as having revolutionized the short story, especially in its tendency to move forward and backward in time, and with integrated short story cycles, in which she displayed "inarguable virtuosity". Her stories have been said to "embed more than announce, reveal more than parade". Munro was seen as a pioneer in short story telling, with the Swedish Academy calling her a "master of the contemporary short story" who could "accommodate the entire epic complexity of the novel in just a few short pages". In her New York Times obituary, Munro's works were credited for "attracting a new generation of readers" and she was called a "master of the short story". Her work is often compared with that of the most critically acclaimed short story writers.

Her works and career have been ranked alongside other well-established short story writers such as Anton Chekhov and John Cheever. As in Chekhov, Garan Holcombe writes: "All is based on the epiphanic moment, the sudden enlightenment, the concise, subtle, revelatory detail." Her work deals with "love and work, and the failings of both. She shares Chekhov's obsession with time and our much-lamented inability to delay or prevent its relentless movement forward."

Munro's work has been considered a "national treasure" of Canada as it focuses largely on life in rural Canada from a woman's perspective.

Canadian novelist Margaret Atwood called Munro a "pioneer for women, and for Canadians". The Associated Press said that Munro created "stories set around Canada that appealed to readers far away."

Sherry Linkon, professor at Georgetown University, said that Munro's works "helped remodel and revitalize the short-story form". The complexity of the themes explored in her work, such as womanhood, death, relationships, aging, and themes associated with the counterculture of the 1960s, were seen as groundbreaking.

Upon winning the Man Booker International Prize, her works were described by judges of the committee as bringing "as much depth, wisdom and precision to every story as most novelists bring to a lifetime of novels".

The news of the sexual abuse of Munro's daughter caused a reassessment of both Munro's life and her literary legacy. Novelist Rebecca Makkai wrote, "the revelations don't just defile the artist, but the art itself". Writer Brandon Taylor said, "I think we cannot talk about Munro's art without also talking about this aspect of her life".

== Selected awards and honours ==
- 1968: Governor General's Literary Award for English language fiction for Dance of the Happy Shades
- 1971: Canadian Booksellers Award for Lives of Girls and Women
- 1977: Canada-Australia Literary Prize, inaugural prize
- 1978: Governor General's Literary Award for English language fiction for Who Do You Think You Are?
- 1980: Booker Prize for Fiction (shortlisted) for Who Do You Think You Are? (as The Beggar Maid)
- 1982: Nominated for a Governor General's Literary Award for English language fiction for The Moons of Jupiter
- 1986: Governor General's Literary Award for English language fiction for The Progress of Love
- 1986: Writers' Trust of Canada's Marian Engel Award for her body of work
- 1990: Trillium Book Award for Friend of My Youth
- 1991: Commonwealth Writers Prize for Canada and the Caribbean Region shortlisted for Friend of My Youth
- 1994: Governor General's Award for Open Secrets
- 1994: Trillium Book Award, English nomination for Open Secrets
- 1994: WH Smith Literary Award for Open Secrets
- 1995: Lannan Literary Award for Fiction
- 1996: Trillium Book Award, English nomination for Selected Stories
- 1997: PEN/Malamud Award
- 1998: Giller Prize nomination for The Love of a Good Woman
- 1998: National Book Critics Circle Award for Fiction for The Love of a Good Woman
- 1998: Trillium Book Award, English for The Love of a Good Woman
- 1999: Libris Award for Author of the Year
- 1999: Libris Award for Fiction Book of the Year for The Love of a Good Woman
- 2001: Rea Award for the Short Story
- 2001: Trillium Book Award, English nomination for Hateship, Friendship, Courtship, Loveship, Marriage
- 2002: Commonwealth Writers Prize for Canada and the Caribbean Region shortlisted for Hateship, Friendship, Courtship, Loveship, Marriage
- 2002: Giller Prize for Runaway
- 2004: Rogers Writers' Trust Fiction Prize for Runaway
- 2004: Trillium Book Award, English nomination for Runaway
- 2004: Giller Prize for The View from Castle Rock
- 2005: Commonwealth Writers Prize for Canada and the Caribbean Region shortlisted for Runaway
- 2006: Edward MacDowell Medal for outstanding contribution to the arts by the MacDowell Colony
- 2007: Commonwealth Writers Prize for Canada and the Caribbean Region shortlisted for The View from Castle Rock
- 2009: Man Booker International Prize
- 2009: Trillium Book Award, English nomination for Too Much Happiness
- 2013: Trillium Book Award, English for Dear Life
- 2013: Nobel Prize in Literature

Additionally, she was awarded the O. Henry Award for continuing achievement in short fiction in the U.S. for "Passion" (2006), "What Do You Want To Know For" (2008) and "Corrie" (2012)

=== Honours ===
- 1993: Royal Society of Canada's Lorne Pierce Medal
- 1997: Foreign Honorary Member of the American Academy of Arts and Letters
- 2002: Elected Fellow of the Royal Society of Literature
- 2005: Medal of Honor for Literature from the U.S. National Arts Club
- 2010: Government of France – Knight of the Order of Arts and Letters
- 2014: Silver coin released by the Royal Canadian Mint in honour of Munro's Nobel Prize win
- 2015: Postage stamp released by Canada Post in honour of Munro's Nobel Prize win

== Works ==
=== Original short story collections ===
- Dance of the Happy Shades (1968)
- Lives of Girls and Women (1971)
- Something I've Been Meaning to Tell You (1974)
- Who Do You Think You Are? (1978)
- The Moons of Jupiter (1982)
- The Progress of Love (1986)
- Friend of My Youth (1990)
- Open Secrets (1994)
- The Love of a Good Woman (1998)
- Hateship, Friendship, Courtship, Loveship, Marriage (2001)
- Runaway (2004)
- The View from Castle Rock (2006)
- Too Much Happiness (2009)
- Dear Life (2012)

=== Short story compilations ===
- Selected Stories (later retitled Selected Stories 1968–1994 and A Wilderness Station: Selected Stories, 1968–1994) – 1996
- No Love Lost – 2003
- Vintage Munro – 2004Munro, Alice (2004). Vintage Munro. New York: Vintage. ISBN 978-1-4000-3395-9.
- Alice Munro's Best: A Selection of Stories – Toronto 2006 / Carried Away: A Selection of Stories – New York 2006; both 17 stories (spanning 1977–2004) with an introduction by Margaret Atwood
- My Best Stories – 2009
- New Selected Stories – 2011
- Lying Under the Apple Tree. New Selected Stories – 2014
- Family Furnishings: Selected Stories 1995–2014 – 2014
