= The Love of a Good Woman =

1998 short story collection by Alice Munro

- First edition (McClelland & Stewart)
- Author: Alice Munro
- Language: English
- Published: 1998 (McClelland and Stewart)
- Publication place: Canada
- Media type: Print

The Love of a Good Woman is a collection of short stories by Canadian writer Alice Munro, published by McClelland and Stewart in 1998.

The eight stories of this collection (one of which was originally published in Saturday Night; five others were originally published in The New Yorker) deal with Munro's typical themes: secrets, love, betrayal, and the stuff of ordinary lives.

The book was awarded the 1998 Giller Prize, and was one of the selected books in the 2004 edition of Canada Reads, where it was championed by soprano Measha Brueggergosman. It also won the 1998 National Book Critics Circle Award for fiction.

== Stories ==
- "The Love of a Good Woman"
- "Jakarta"
- "Cortes Island"
- "Save the Reaper"
- "The Children Stay"
- "Rich as Stink"
- "Before the Change"
- "My Mother's Dream"
