= Short story =

Brief work of prose fiction

A short story is a piece of narrative fiction in written prose that can typically be read in a single sitting. It focuses on a self-contained incident or a series of linked incidents, intended to evoke a single effect or mood. The short story is one of the oldest types of literature and has existed as legends, mythic tales, folk tales, fairy tales, tall tales, fables, and anecdotes in various ancient communities around the world. The modern short story developed in the early 19th century.

== Definition ==
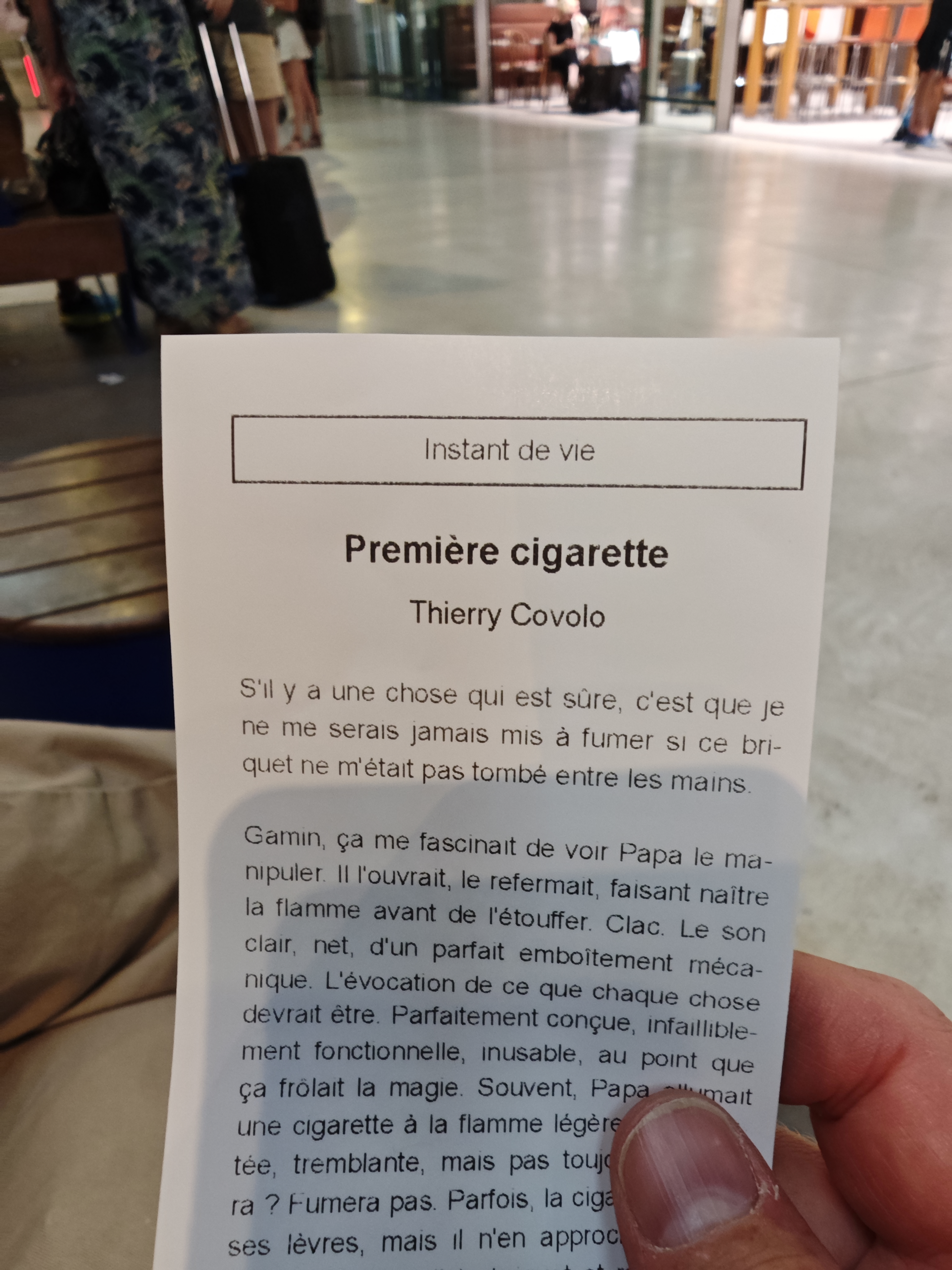
Reader holding a contemporary French short story booklet

The short story is a crafted form in its own right. Short stories make use of plot, resonance and other dynamic components as in a novel, but typically to a lesser degree. While the short story is largely distinct from the novel or novella/short novel, authors generally draw from a common pool of literary techniques. The short story is sometimes referred to as a genre.

Determining what exactly defines a short story remains problematic. A classic definition of a short story is that one should be able to read it in one sitting, a point most notably made in Edgar Allan Poe's essay "The Philosophy of Composition" (1846). H. G. Wells described the purpose of the short story as "The jolly art, of making something very bright and moving; it may be horrible or pathetic or funny or profoundly illuminating, having only this essential, that it should take from fifteen to fifty minutes to read aloud." According to William Faulkner, a short story is character-driven and a writer's job is to "...trot along behind him with a paper and pencil trying to keep up long enough to put down what he says and does."

Some authors have argued that a short story must have a strict form. Somerset Maugham thought that the short story "must have a definite design, which includes a point of departure, a climax and a point of test; in other words, it must have a plot". Hugh Walpole had a similar view: "A story should be a story; a record of things happening full of incidents, swift movements, unexpected development, leading through suspense to a climax and a satisfying denouement."

However, this view of the short story as a finished product of art is opposed by Anton Chekhov, who thought that a story should have neither a beginning nor an end. It should just be a "slice of life", presented suggestively. In his stories, Chekhov does not round off the end but leaves it to the readers to draw their own conclusions.

Sukumar Azhikode defined a short story as "a brief prose narrative with an intense episodic or anecdotal effect". Flannery O'Connor emphasized the need to consider what exactly is meant by the descriptor short. Short story writers may define their works as part of the artistic and personal expression of the form. They may also attempt to resist categorization by genre and fixed formation.

William Boyd, a British author and short story writer, has said:

[a short story] seem[s] to answer something very deep in our nature as if, for the duration of its telling, something special has been created, some essence of our experience extrapolated, some temporary sense has been made of our common, turbulent journey towards the grave and oblivion.

In the 1880s, the term "short story" acquired its modern meaning – having initially referred to children's tales. During the early to mid-20th century, the short story underwent expansive experimentation which further hindered attempts to comprehensively provide a definition. Longer stories that cannot be called novels are sometimes considered "novellas" or novelettes and, like short stories, may be collected into the more marketable form of "collections". Around the world, the modern short story is comparable to lyrics, dramas, novels and essays – although examination of it as a major literary form remains diminished.

== Length ==
In terms of length, word count is typically anywhere from 1,000 to 4,000 for short stories; however, some works classified as short stories have up to 15,000 words. Stories of fewer than 1,000 words are sometimes referred to as "short short stories", or "flash fiction".

Short stories have no set length. What constitutes a short story may differ between genres, countries, eras, and commentators. Like the novel, the short story's predominant shape reflects the demands of the available markets for publication, and the evolution of the form seems closely tied to the evolution of the publishing industry and the submission guidelines of its constituent houses.

As a point of reference for the genre writer, the Science Fiction and Fantasy Writers of America defines short story length in the Nebula Awards for science fiction submission guidelines as having fewer than 7,500 words.

== History ==
=== Prehistory – 1790 CE ===
Short stories date back to oral storytelling traditions which originally produced epics such as the Ramayana, the Mahabharata, and Homer's Iliad and Odyssey. Oral narratives were often told in the form of rhyming or rhythmic verse, often including recurring sections or, in the case of Homer, Homeric epithets. Such stylistic devices often acted as mnemonics for easier recall, rendition, and adaptation of the story. While the overall arc of the tale was told over the course of several performances, short sections of verse could focus on individual narratives that were the duration of a single telling. It may be helpful to classify such sections as oral short stories.

Another ancient form of short story popular during the Roman Empire was the anecdote, a brief realistic narrative that embodies a point. Many surviving Roman anecdotes were collected in the 13th or 14th century as the Gesta Romanorum. Anecdotes remained popular throughout Europe well into the 18th century with the publication of the fictional anecdotal letters of Sir Roger de Coverley.

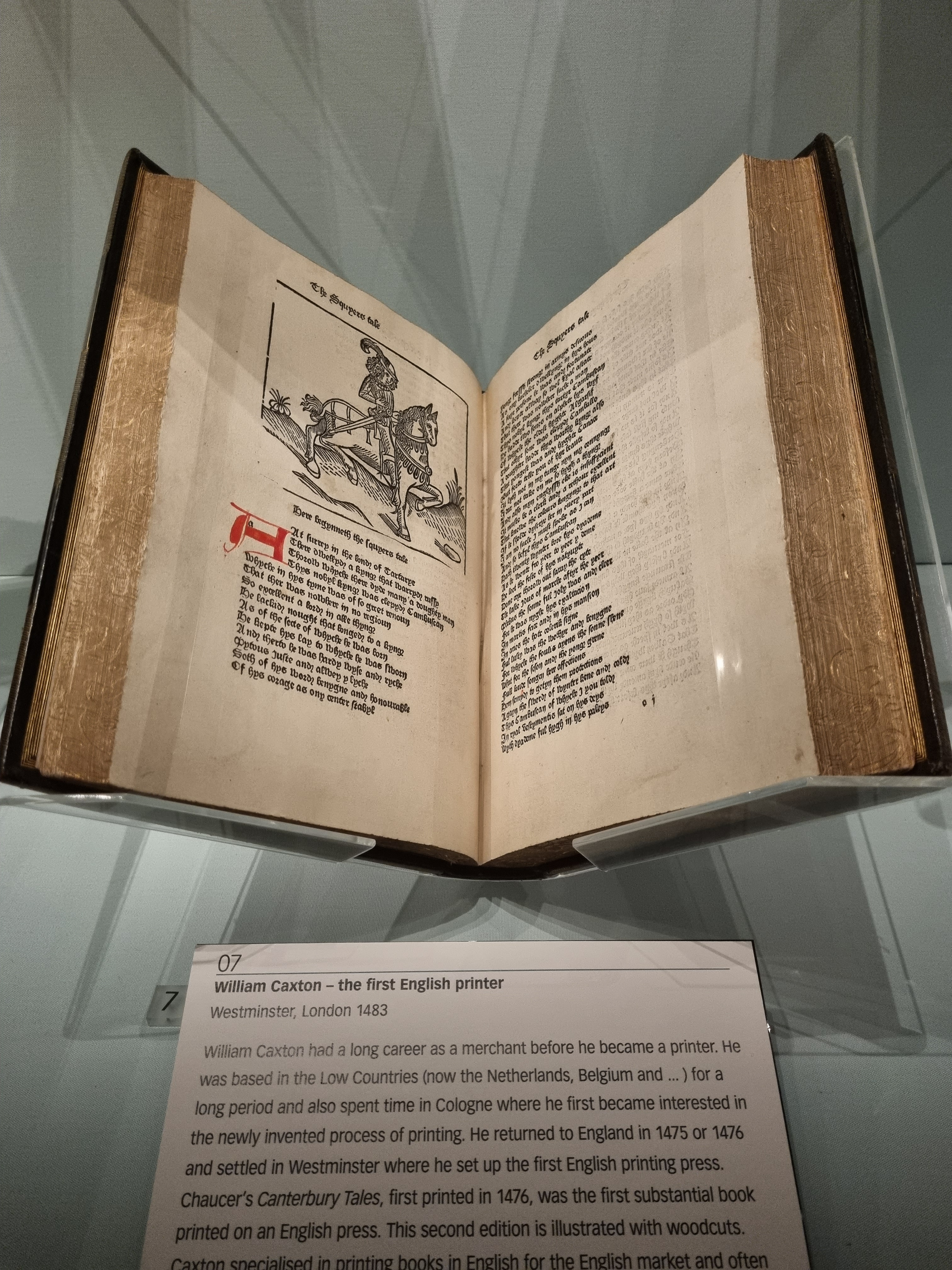
Canterbury Tales, William Caxton edition

In Europe, the oral story-telling tradition began to develop into written form in the early 14th century, most notably with Giovanni Boccaccio's Decameron and Geoffrey Chaucer's Canterbury Tales. Both of these books are composed of individual short stories, which range from farce or humorous anecdotes to well-crafted literary fiction, set within a larger narrative story (a frame story), although the frame-tale device was not adopted by all writers. At the end of the 16th century, some of the most popular short stories in Europe were the darkly tragic "novella" of Italian author Matteo Bandello, especially in their French translation.

The mid 17th century in France saw the development of a refined short novel, the "nouvelle", by such authors as Madame de Lafayette. Traditional fairy tales began to be published in the late 17th century; one of the most famous collections was by Charles Perrault. The appearance of Antoine Galland's first modern translation of the 1001 Arabian Nights, a storehouse of Middle Eastern folk and fairy tales, is the Thousand and One Nights (or Arabian Nights) (from 1704; another translation appeared in 1710–12). His translation would have an enormous influence on the 18th-century European short stories of Voltaire, Diderot and others.

In India, there is a rich heritage of ancient folktales as well as a compiled body of short fiction which shaped the sensibility of modern Indian short story. Some of the famous Sanskrit collections of legends, folktales, fairy tales, and fables are Panchatantra, Hitopadesha and Kathasaritsagara. Jataka tales, originally written in Pali, is a compilation of tales concerning the previous births of Lord Gautama Buddha. The Frame story, also known as the frame narrative or story within a story, is a narrative technique that probably originated in ancient Indian works such as Panchatantra.

The evolution of printing technologies and periodical editions were among the factors contributing to the increasing importance of short story publications. Pioneering the rules of the genre in the Western canon were, among others, Rudyard Kipling (United Kingdom), Anton Chekhov (Russia), Guy de Maupassant (France), Rabindranath Tagore (India and Bangladesh), Manuel Gutiérrez Nájera (Mexico) and Rubén Darío (Nicaragua).

=== 1790–1850 ===
Early examples of short stories were published separately between 1790 and 1810, but the first true collections of short stories appeared between 1810 and 1830 in several countries.

The first short stories in the United Kingdom were gothic tales like Richard Cumberland's "remarkable narrative", "The Poisoner of Montremos" (1791). Novelists such as Sir Walter Scott and Charles Dickens also wrote influential short stories during this time. Germany soon followed the United Kingdom's example by producing short stories; the first collection of short stories was by Heinrich von Kleist in 1810 and 1811. In the United States, Washington Irving was responsible for creating some of the first short stories of American origin, "The Legend of Sleepy Hollow" and "Rip Van Winkle".

Edgar Allan Poe became another early American short story writer. His concise technique, deemed the "single effect", has had tremendous influence on the formation of the modern short story.

Examples include:

- France
  - Prosper Mérimée
    - Mateo Falcone (1829)
- Germany
  - E. T. A. Hoffmann
    - "The Nutcracker and the Mouse King" (1816),
    - "The Sandman",
  - Brothers Grimm
    - Grimms' Fairy Tales (1812)
- United States
  - Edgar Allan Poe
    - "The Fall of the House of Usher",
    - "The Tell-Tale Heart",
    - "The Cask of Amontillado",
    - "The Pit and the Pendulum",
    - "The Gold Bug",
    - "The Murders in the Rue Morgue" – one of the first detective stories
    - "The Purloined Letter" – one of the first detective stories
  - Nathaniel Hawthorne
    - Twice-Told Tales (1837)
  - John Neal
    - "Otter-Bag, the Oneida Chief" (1829)
    - "David Whicher" (1832)

=== 1850–1900 ===
In the latter half of the 19th century, the growth of print magazines and journals created a strong demand for short fiction of between 3,000 and 15,000 words. In 1890s Britain, literary periodicals such as The Yellow Book, Black & White, and The Strand Magazine popularized the short story. Britain was not alone in the endeavor to strengthen the short story movement. French author Guy de Maupassant composed the short stories "Boule de Suif" ("Ball of Fat", 1880) and "L'Inutile Beauté" ("The Useless Beauty", 1890), which are important examples of French realism. Russian author Anton Chekhov was also influential in the movement.

In the late nineteenth and early twentieth century in India, many writers created short stories centered on daily life and the social scene of the different socioeconomic groups. Rabindranath Tagore published more than 150 short stories on the lives of the poor and oppressed such as peasants, women, and villagers under colonial misrule and exploitation. Sarat Chandra Chattopadhyay, Tagore's contemporary, was another pioneer in Bengali short stories. Chattopadhyay's stories focused on the social scenario of rural Bengal and the lives of common people, especially the oppressed classes. The prolific Indian author of short stories Munshi Premchand, pioneered the genre in the Hindustani language, writing over 200 short stories and many novels in a style characterized by realism and an unsentimental and authentic introspection into the complexities of Indian society.

In 1884, Brander Matthews, the first American professor of dramatic literature, published The Philosophy of the Short-Story. During that same year, Matthews was the first one to name the emerging genre "short story". Another theorist of narrative fiction was Henry James, who produced some of the most influential short narratives of the time.

The spread of the short story movement continued into South America, specifically Brazil. The novelist Machado de Assis was an important short story writer from Brazil at the time, under the influences of Xavier de Maistre, Laurence Sterne, Guy de Maupassant, among others. At the end of the 19th century, the writer João do Rio became popular by short stories about the bohemianism. Lima Barreto wrote about the former slaves and nationalism in Brazil, with his most recognized work being Triste Fim de Policarpo Quaresma.

Examples include:

- India
  - Rabindranath Tagore
    - "The Kabuliwala"
    - "The Hungry Stone"
    - "The Wife's Letter"
    - "The Parrot's Training"
    - "Punishment"
  - Sarat Chandra Chattopadhyay
    - "Bindu's Son"
    - "Abhagi's Heaven"
    - "Mahesh"
    - "Ram's Good Lesson"
    - "Lalu" (3 parts)
    - "The Husband"
  - Premchand
    - "The Shroud"
    - "The Cost of Milk"
    - "Lottery"
- Poland
  - Bolesław Prus
    - "A Legend of Old Egypt" (1888)
  - Eliza Orzeszkowa
    - "Panna Antonina" (1888)
    - "W zimowy wieczór" (1888)
  - Henryk Sienkiewicz
    - "The Lighthouse keeper" (1881)
    - "Charcoal Sketches" (1877)
- Portugal
  - Almeida Garrett
  - Alexandre Herculano
  - Eça de Queiroz
- Russia
  - Ivan Turgenev
    - A Sportsman's Sketches
  - Fyodor Dostoyevski
    - "The Meek One" (1876)
    - "The Dream of a Ridiculous Man" (1877)
  - Leo Tolstoy
    - "Ivan the Fool" (1885)
    - "How Much Land Does a Man Need?" (1886)
    - "Alyosha the Pot" (1905)
  - Anton Chekhov
    - "The Bet" (1889)
    - "Ward No. 6" (1892)
    - "The Lady with the Dog" (1899)
  - Maxim Gorky
    - "Twenty-six Men and a Girl" (1899)
- United Kingdom
  - Thomas Hardy
    - "The Three Strangers" (1883),
    - "A Mere Interlude" (1885),
    - "Barbara of the House of Grebe" (1890)
  - Rudyard Kipling
    - Plain Tales from the Hills (1888)
    - The Jungle Book (1894)
  - Arthur Conan Doyle
    - The Adventures of Sherlock Holmes (1892) – detective story
  - H. G. Wells – science fiction
    - "The Country of the Blind" (1904)
- United States
  - Herman Melville
    - The Piazza Tales (1856)
  - Mark Twain
    - "The Celebrated Jumping Frog of Calaveras County"
  - Henry James
    - "The Real Thing" (1892)
    - "Maud-Evelyn"
    - The Beast in the Jungle (1903)
  - Kate Chopin
  - Stephen Crane

=== 1900–1945 ===
In the United Kingdom, periodicals like The Strand Magazine and The Story-Teller contributed to the popularity of the short story. Several authors during this time wrote short stories centered on the devices of satire and humor. One such author, Hector Hugh Munro (1870–1916), also known by his pen name of Saki, wrote satirical short stories about Edwardian England. P. G. Wodehouse published his first collection of comical stories about the valet, Jeeves, in 1917. Other common genres of short stories during the early to mid 1900s in England were detective stories and thrillers. Many of these detective stories were written by authors such as G. K. Chesterton, Agatha Christie, and Dorothy L. Sayers. Graham Greene wrote his collection of short stories, Twenty-One Stories, between 1929 and 1954. Many of these short stories are classified in the genres of thriller, suspense, or even horror. The European short story movement during this time was not unique to England. In Ireland, James Joyce published his short story collection Dubliners in 1914. These stories, written in a more accessible style than his later novels, are based on careful observation of the inhabitants of his birth city.

In the first half of the 20th century, a number of high-profile American magazines such as The Atlantic Monthly, Harper's Magazine, The New Yorker, Scribner's, The Saturday Evening Post, Esquire, and The Bookman published short stories in each issue. The demand for quality short stories was so great and the money paid so well that F. Scott Fitzgerald repeatedly turned to short-story writing to pay his numerous debts. His first collection, Flappers and Philosophers, appeared in book form in 1920. Ernest Hemingway's concise writing style was perfectly suited for shorter fiction. Influenced by the short stories of Stephen Crane and Jack London, Hemingway's work "marks a new phase in the history of the short story". The creation and study of the short story as a medium began to emerge as an academic discipline due to Blanche Colton Williams's "groundbreaking work on structure and analysis of the short story" and her publication of A Handbook on Short Story Writing (1917), described as "the first practical aid to growing young writers that was put on the market in this country."

In Uruguay, Horacio Quiroga became one of the most influential short story writers in the Spanish language. With a clear influence from Edgar Allan Poe, he had a great skill in using the supernatural and the bizarre to show the struggle of man and animal to survive. He also excelled in portraying mental illness and hallucinatory states.

In India, Saadat Hasan Manto, the master of the short story in the Urdu language, is revered for his exceptional depth, irony, and sardonic humor. The author of some 250 short stories, radio plays, essays, reminiscences, and a novel, Manto is widely admired for his analyses of violence, bigotry, prejudice, and the relationships between reason and unreason. Combining realism with surrealism and irony, Manto's works, such as the celebrated short story Toba Tek Singh, are aesthetic masterpieces that continue to give profound insight into the nature of human loss, violence, and devastation. Another famous Urdu writer is Ismat Chughtai, whose short story, "Lihaaf" (The Quilt), on a lesbian relationship between an upper-class Muslim woman and her maidservant created great controversy following its publication in 1942.

Notable examples in the period up to World War II include:

- Bohemia
  - Franz Kafka
    - "A Hunger Artist" (1922)
- Brazil
  - Mário de Andrade
  - António de Alcantâra Machado
    - Brás, Bexiga e Barra Funda (1928)
  - Graciliano Ramos
  - Carlos Drummond de Andrade
- England
  - Virginia Woolf
    - "Kew Gardens" (1919)
    - "Solid Objects"
  - W. Somerset Maugham
  - V. S. Pritchett
  - Evelyn Waugh
  - Muriel Spark
  - L. P. Hartley
  - Arthur C. Clarke
    - "Travel by Wire!" (1937)
- Germany
  - Thomas Mann
- Hindi
  - Jaishankar Prasad
- Japan
  - Ryūnosuke Akutagawa
- New Zealand
  - Katherine Mansfield
    - "The Doll's House" (1922)
- Portugal
  - Mário de Sá-Carneiro
  - Florbela Espanca
  - Fernando Pessoa
- United States
  - O. Henry
    - "The Ransom of Red Chief",
    - "The Cop and the Anthem",
    - "The Skylight Room",
    - "After Twenty Years",
    - "The Last Leaf",
    - "A Retrieved Reformation"
  - F. Scott Fitzgerald
    - "The Ice Palace"
    - "The Curious Case of Benjamin Button"
    - "Absolution"
    - "The Rich Boy"
  - Ernest Hemingway
    - "A Clean, Well-Lighted Place" (1926)
    - "Hills Like White Elephants" (1927)
    - "The Snows of Kilimanjaro" (1936)
  - William Faulkner
    - Go Down, Moses
  - Dorothy Parker
    - "Big Blonde" (1929)
  - Isaac Asimov
    - "Nightfall"

=== Since 1945 ===
Following World War II, the artistic range and numbers of writers of short stories grew significantly. Due in part to frequent contributions from John O'Hara, The New Yorker would come to exercise substantial influence as a weekly short story publication for more than half a century. Shirley Jackson's story, "The Lottery" (1948), elicited the strongest response in the magazine's history to that time. Other frequent contributors during the 1940s included John Steinbeck, Jean Stafford, Eudora Welty, and John Cheever, who is best known for "The Swimmer" (1964), beautifully blending realism and surrealism.

Many other American short story writers greatly influenced the evolving form of the short story. For example, J. D. Salinger's Nine Stories (1953) experimented with point of view and voice, while Flannery O'Connor's well-known story, "A Good Man Is Hard to Find" (1955), reinvigorated the Southern Gothic style. Cultural and social identity played a considerable role in much of the short fiction of the 1960s. Philip Roth and Grace Paley cultivated distinctive Jewish-American voices. Tillie Olsen's "I Stand Here Ironing" (1961) adopted a consciously feminist perspective. James Baldwin's collection, Going to Meet the Man (1965), told stories of African-American life. Science fiction stories with a special poetic touch was a genre developed with great popular success by Ray Bradbury. Stephen King published many science fiction short stories in men's magazines in the 1960s and after. King's interest is in the supernatural and macabre. Donald Barthelme and John Barth produced works in the 1970s that demonstrate the rise of the postmodern short story. While traditionalism maintained a significant influence on the form of the short story, minimalism gained widespread influence in the 1980s, most notably in the work of Raymond Carver and Ann Beattie. Carver helped usher in an "extreme minimalist aesthetic" and expand the scope of the short story, as did Lydia Davis, through her idiosyncratic and laconic style.

The Argentine writer Jorge Luis Borges is one of the best-known writers of short stories in the Spanish language. "The Library of Babel" (1941) and "The Aleph" (1945) handle difficult subjects like infinity. Borges won American fame with "The Garden of Forking Paths", published in the August 1948 issue of Ellery Queen's Mystery Magazine. Two of the most representative writers of the Magical realism genre are also widely known Argentine short story writers, Adolfo Bioy Casares and Julio Cortázar. The Nobel laureate author Gabriel García Márquez and the Uruguayan writer Juan Carlos Onetti are further significant magical realist short story writers from the Hispanic world. In Brazil, João Antonio made a name for himself by writing about poverty and the favelas. Detective literature there was led by Rubem Fonseca. João Guimarães Rosa wrote short stories in the book Sagarana, using a complex, experimental language based on tales of oral tradition.

The role of the bi-monthly magazine Desh (first published in 1933) was key in development of the Bengali short story. Two of the most popular detective story writers of Bengali literature are Sharadindu Bandyopadhyay (the creator of Byomkesh Bakshi) and Satyajit Ray (the creator of Feluda).

Notable examples in the post–World War II period include:

- Angola
  - José Luandino Vieira
  - José Eduardo Agualusa
- Bengali
  - Tarasankar Bandyopadhyay
  - Manik Bandyopadhyay
  - Mahasweta Devi
  - Shirshendu Mukhopadhyay
  - Suchitra Bhattacharya
  - Ramapada Chowdhury
  - Humayun Ahmed
- Brazil
  - Clarice Lispector
  - Lygia Fagundes Telles
  - Adélia Prado
  - Dalton Trevisan
  - Autran Dourado
  - Moacyr Scliar
  - Carlos Heitor Cony
  - Hilda Hilst
  - Caio Fernando Abreu
- Chile
  - José Donoso
  - Augusto d'Halmar
  - Manuel Rojas
  - Diamela Eltit
  - Alberto Fuguet
  - José Baroja
  - Alejandro Zambra
- Egypt
  - Naguib Mahfouz – 1988 Nobel Prize in Literature winner
- Hindi
  - Amrita Pritam
  - Dharamvir Bharati
  - Bhisham Sahni
  - Krishna Sobti
  - Nirmal Verma
  - Kamleshwar
  - Mannu Bhandari
  - Harishankar Parsai
- Tamil
  - Pudhumaipithan
- Italy
  - Italo Calvino
    - Marcovaldo (1963)
- Japan
  - Kenzaburō Ōe – 1994 Nobel Prize in Literature winner
  - Yukio Mishima
  - Haruki Murakami
- Mozambique
  - Suleiman Cassamo
  - Paulina Chiziane
  - Eduardo White
  - Mia Couto
- Peru
  - Mario Vargas Llosa – 2010 Nobel Prize in Literature winner
- Philippines
  - Peter Solis Nery
    - "Lirio" (1998)
    - "Candido" (2007)
    - "Donato Bugtot" (2011)
    - "Si Padre Olan kag ang Dios" (2013)
- Poland
  - Kornel Filipowicz
  - Katarzyna Grochola
  - Paweł Huelle
  - Sławomir Mrożek
  - Magdalena Tulli
- Portugal
  - Vergílio Ferreira
  - Fernando Goncalves Namora
  - Sophia de Mello Breyner Andresen
  - José Saramago
- United Kingdom
  - Roald Dahl
  - Helen Simpson
  - Daphne du Maurier
    - "The Birds" (1952)
    - "Don't Look Now" (1971)
- United States
  - Frank O'Connor
    - The Lonely Voice
  - Wallace Stegner
  - John Updike
  - Joyce Carol Oates
  - Denis Johnson
    - Jesus' Son

== Sales and profits ==
Sales of short-story fiction are strong. In the UK, sales jumped 45% in 2017, driven by collections from international names such as Alice Munro, a high number of new writers to the genre, including famous names like actor Tom Hanks (plus those who publish their work using readily accessible, digital tools), and the revival of short story salons such as those held by the short fiction company Pin Drop Studio. Female short story writers have gained increased critical attention, with British authors, in particular, exploring modern feminist politics in their writings.

More than 690,000 short stories and anthologies were sold in the UK in 2017, generating £5.88 million, the genre's highest sales since 2010. Throughout the 2010s, there was frequent speculation about a potential "renaissance"; Sam Baker called it a "perfect literary form for the 21st century".

Canadian short story writers include Alice Munro, Mavis Gallant and Lynn Coady. In 2013, Alice Munro became the first writer of nothing but short stories to be awarded the Nobel Prize in Literature. Her award-winning short story collections include Dance of the Happy Shades, Lives of Girls and Women, Who Do You Think You Are?, The Progress of Love, The Love of a Good Woman and Runaway.

== Awards ==
Prominent short story awards such as the Sunday Times Short Story Award, the BBC National Short Story Award, the Royal Society of Literature's V.S. Pritchett Short Story Prize, The London Magazine Short Story Prize, the Pin Drop Studio Short Story Award and many others attract hundreds of entries each year. Published and non-published writers take part, sending in their stories from around the world.

In 2013, Alice Munro was awarded the Nobel Prize in Literature – her citation read: "master of the contemporary short story". She said she hopes the award will bring readership for the short story, as well as recognising the short story for its own merit, rather than "something that people do before they write their first novel". Short stories were cited in the choice of other laureates as well: Paul Heyse in 1910 and Gabriel García Márquez in 1982.

== Adaptations ==
Short stories are sometimes adapted for radio, TV or film:

- Radio dramas, as on NBC Presents: Short Story (1951–52). A popular example of this is "The Hitch-Hiker", read by Orson Welles.
- Short films, often rewritten by other writers, and even as feature films; such is the case of "Children of the Corn", "The Shawshank Redemption", "The Birds", "Brokeback Mountain", "Who Goes There?", "Duel", "A Sound of Thunder", "The Body", "Total Recall", "The Lawnmower Man", "Hearts in Atlantis", and "The Secret Life of Walter Mitty".
- Television specials, such as "12:01 P.M." (a 1993 television movie), "Nightmare at 20,000 Feet" (an October 11, 1963, episode of The Twilight Zone), "The Lottery", and "Button, Button" (on The Twilight Zone).

== Characteristics ==
As a concentrated, concise form of narrative and descriptive prose fiction, the short story has been theorised about through the traditional elements of dramatic structure: exposition (the introduction of setting, situation, and main characters), complication (the event that introduces the conflict), rising action, crisis (the decisive moment for the protagonist and his commitment to a course of action), climax (the point of highest interest in terms of the conflict and the point with the most action) and resolution (the point when the conflict is resolved). Because of their length, short stories may or may not often follow this pattern. For example, modern short stories only occasionally have an exposition, more typically beginning in the middle of the action (in medias res). As with longer stories, plots of short stories also have a climax, crisis or turning point. In general, short stories feature endings which might be either conclusive or open-ended. Ambiguity is a recurrent trope in short stories; whether in their ending, characterisation or length. As with any art form, the exact characteristics of a short story will vary depending on who is its creator.

Characteristic of short story authors, according to professor of English, Clare Hanson, is that they are "losers and loners, exiles, women, blacks – writers who for one reason or another have not been part of the ruling 'narrative' or epistemological/experiential framework of their society".

== See also ==
- Conte (literature)
- Conte cruel
- Literary magazine
- Minisaga
- Sketch story
- Vignette (literature)

== Bibliography ==
- Browns, Julie, ed. (1997). Ethnicity and the American Short Story. New York: Garland.
- Dillard, Annie. (1990). The Writing Life. Harper Perennial. ISBN 0-06-016156-6
- Gelfant, Blanche; Lawrence Graver, eds. (2000). The Columbia Companion to the Twentieth-Century American Short Story. Columbia University Press. ISBN 9780231110983.
- Goyet, Florence (2014). The Classic Short Story, 1870-1925. Cambridge: Open Book Publishers. (free download: https://unglue.it/work/136328/#)
- Hart, James; Phillip Leininger, eds. (1995). Oxford Companion to American Literature. Oxford University Press. ISBN 978-0-19-506548-0.
- Hayes, Kevin J. (2012-03-15). A Journey Through American Literature. Oxford University Press. doi:10.1093/acprof:osobl/9780199862078.001.0001. ISBN 978-0-19-986207-8.
- Ibáñez, José R; José Francisco Fernández; Carmen M. Bretones, eds. (2007). Contemporary Debates on the Short Story. Bern: Lang.
- Iftekharrudin, Farhat; Joseph Boyden; Joseph Longo; Mary Rohrberger, eds. (2003). Postmodern Approaches to the Short Story. Westport, CN: Praeger.
- Kennedy, Gerald J., ed. (2011). Modern American Short Story Sequences: Composite Fictions and Fictive Communities. Cambridge: Cambridge University Press.
- Lohafer, Susan (2003). Reading for Storyness: Preclosure Theory, Empirical Poetics, and Culture in the Short Story. Baltimore, MD: Johns Hopkins University Press.
- Magill, Frank, ed. (1997). Short Story Writers. Pasadena, California: Salem Press.
- Mitchell, Lee Clark (2019-04-04). More Time: Contemporary Short Stories and Late Style (1 ed.). Oxford University Press. doi:10.1093/oso/9780198839224.001.0001. ISBN 978-0-19-883922-4.
- Patea, Viorica, ed. (2012). Short Story Theories: A Twenty-First-Century Perspective. Amsterdam: Rodopi.
- Scofield, Martin, ed. (2006). The Cambridge Introduction to the American Short Story. Cambridge: Cambridge University Press.
- Storr, Will (2020). The Science of Storytelling William Collins Publications ISBN 978-0-00-827697-3
- The Persephone Book of Short Stories (2012) Persephone Books Ltd. ISBN 978-1903-155-905
- Watson, Noelle, ed. (1994). Reference Guide to Short Fiction. Detroit: St. James Press. ISBN 9781558623347.
- Winther, Per; Jakob Lothe; Hans H. Skei, eds. (2004). The Art of Brevity: Excursions in Short Fiction Theory and Analysis. Columbia, SC: University of South Carolina Press.
- Young, Emma (2018-09-20). Contemporary Feminism and Women's Short Stories. Vol. 1. Edinburgh University Press. doi:10.3366/edinburgh/9781474427739.001.0001. ISBN 978-1-4744-2773-9. S2CID 165346441.

Still often cited

- Bates, HE (1988). The Modern Short Story from 1809 to 1953. London: Hale.
- Eikhenbaum, Boris (1982). "How Gogol's 'Overcoat' is Made". In Elizabeth Trahan (ed.). Gogol's "Overcoat": An Anthology of Critical Essays. Ann Arbor, MI: Ardis.
- Hanson, Clare (1985). Short Stories and Short Fictions, 1880–1980. New York: St. Martin's Press.
- LoCicero, Donald (1970). Novellentheorie: The Practicality of the Theoretical. (About the German theories of the Short Story) The Hague: Mouton.
- Lohafer, Susan; Jo Ellyn Clarey, eds. (1990). Short Story Theory at a Crossroads. Baton Rouge, LA: Louisiana State University Press.
- Mann, Susan Garland (1989). The Short Story Cycle: A Genre Companion and Reference Guide. New York: Greenwood Press.
- O'Connor, Frank (1963). The Lonely Voice: A Study of the Short Story. Cleveland, OH: World Publishing Company.
- O'Faoláin, Seán (1951). The short story. Cork: Mercier, 1948; New York: Devin-Adair.
- Rohrberger, Mary (1966). Hawthorne and the Modern Short Story: A Study in Genre. The Hague: Mouton.
