= Macmillan of Canada =

Canadian publisher

- Parent company: Macmillan Publishers (1905-1973); Maclean-Hunter (1973-1980); Gage Educational Publishing Company (1980-1998); CDG Books (1998-2002)
- Status: Defunct
- Founded: 1905
- Founder: Macmillan
- Defunct: 2002
- Successor: John Wiley & Sons Canada
- Country of origin: Canada
- Publication types: Books
- Imprints: Laurentian Library

Macmillan of Canada was a Canadian publishing house.

The company was founded in 1905 as the Canadian arm of the English publisher Macmillan. At that time it was known as the "Macmillan Company of Canada Ltd." In the course of its existence the name changed to "Macmillan of Canada" and "Macmillan Canada".

Macmillan of Canada was sold to Maclean-Hunter in 1973, who, some seven years later, sold it to Gage Educational Publishing Company. The company was most influential in the 1970s and 1980s under editor and publisher Douglas Gibson, who brought many of Canada's most prominent and influential writers of the era to the company; however, his departure for McClelland & Stewart in 1986 greatly weakened the company's fiction division as the majority of its writers followed Gibson to the competing company.

In 1998, Macmillan Canada, as it was then known, became an imprint of CDG Books, which was formed as a joint venture of Gage and US publisher Hungry Minds. CDG was purchased in 2002 by John Wiley & Sons, who had acquired Hungry Minds the year before. At this time Macmillan Canada ceased to exist either as an imprint or a publishing house.

== Noted authors ==
Over its nearly 100 years of existence Macmillan's published authors such as:

- Morley Callaghan
- Robertson Davies
- Mazo de la Roche
- Mavis Gallant
- Grey Owl
- Stephen Leacock
- Hugh MacLennan
- Preston Manning
- W.O. Mitchell
- Alice Munro
- E.J. Pratt
- Carol Shields
- Jack Hodgins
- J. T. Crawford
- J. E. Dean
- W. A. Jackson

Former presidents of Macmillan of Canada included Hugh Eayrs, John M. Gray, Hugh Kane, George W. Gilmour, and J. William Baker
