= Kowalewski =

Kowalewski (feminine Kowalewska, plural: Kowalewscy) is a Polish surname. It may refer to:

- Aleksander Kowalewski (general) (1879–1940), Polish brigade general
- Aleksander Kowalewski, Polish spelling of Alexander Kovalevsky (1840–1901), Russian embryologist
- Gerhard Kowalewski (1876–1950), German mathematician
- Günter Kowalewski (born 1943), German wrestler
- Jakub Kowalewski (born 1994), Polish luger
- Jan Kowalewski (1892–1965), Polish cryptologist
- Jerzy Kowalewski (born 1944), Polish diver
- Joe Kowalewski (born 1982), American football player
- Józef Kowalewski (1801–1878), Polish orientalist
- Krzysztof Kowalewski (1937–2021), Polish actor
- Kyla Rae Kowalewski (born 2002), American voice actress
- Marlena Kowalewska (born 1992), Polish volleyball player
- Wojciech Kowalewski (born 1977), Polish footballer

== See also ==
- Kowalski, a Polish surname
- Kovalevsky, a Russian surname
