= Anne Jaclard =

Russian socialist, feminist and revolutionary (1843–1887)

- Анна Васильевна Корвин-Круковская
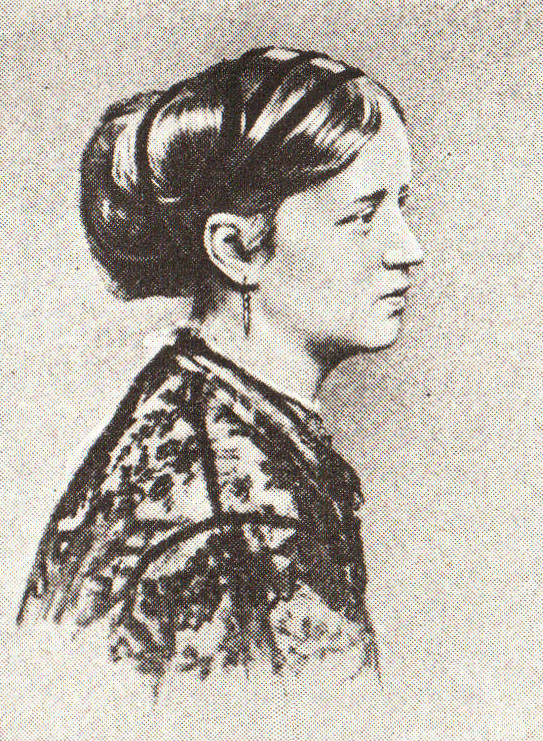
- Born: October 1843; Saint Petersburg, Russian Empire
- Died: 12 September 1887 (aged 43); 6th arrondissement of Paris, Paris, France
- Burial place: Neuilly-sur-Seine Old Communal Cemetery, Hauts-de-Seine, France
- Occupations: Socialist and feminist revolutionary
- Spouse: Victor Jaclard
- Relatives: Sofya Kovalevskaya

Anne Jaclard, born Anna Vasilyevna Korvin-Krukovskaya (Russian: Анна Васильевна Корвин-Круковская, October 1843 – 12 September 1887), was a Russian socialist and feminist revolutionary. She participated in the Paris Commune and the First International and was a friend of Karl Marx. She was once courted by Fyodor Dostoyevsky, who published two of her stories in his journal. Her sister was the mathematician and socialist Sofya Kovalevskaya (1850–1891).

== Early life ==
Anna Vasilevna Korvin-Krukovskaya was born in Saint Petersburg. She came from a respectable, wealthy military family of aristocratic status. Her father Lieutenant General Vasily Vasilyevich Korvin-Krukovsky, served in the Imperial Russian Army as head of the Moscow Artillery before retiring to Polibino, his family estate in Pskov Oblast in 1858. He was a member of the minor Russian nobility, of mixed Belarusian–Polish descent (Polish on his father's side). Her mother, Yelizaveta Fedorovna von Schubert, descended from a family of German immigrants to St. Petersburg who lived on Vasilievsky Island.

Anna and her sister, the future mathematician Sofya Kovalevskaya, were raised in an enlightened household. As young women they read the materialist literature then popular—books by Ludwig Büchner, Carl Vogt and others—and the writings of nihilist and Narodnik social critics like Nikolai Chernyshevsky and Peter Lavrov. Both women became associated with radical Narodnik circles.

In the 1860s, Anna was courted by the famous writer Fyodor Dostoyevsky. She met him in 1864, after publishing two stories in his literary journal, The Epoch, unbeknownst to her family. Dostoyevsky respected her talent and encouraged her writing. However, the two were not politically compatible. Although Dostoyevsky had sympathised with utopian socialist ideas in his youth and had even been banished to Siberia for his involvement in the Petrashevsky Circle, by the 1860s he was becoming increasingly religious and conservative. She rejected his proposal in April 1865, but they remained on friendly terms for the rest of her life. It is thought that Dostoyevsky based the character of Aglaya Epanchina in The Idiot on Anna.

In 1866 Anna Korvin-Krukovskaya went with her mother and sister to Geneva, Switzerland, where she associated with exiled radicals from Russia and elsewhere. In 1869, she left Russia under the pretext of being chaperoned by her younger sister, Sofya, who had undertaken a nominal marriage with a young Russian radical, Vladimir Onufryevich Kovalevsky, together with her husband. But, in fact, Anna went to Paris, and there met Victor Jaclard, a medical student and Blanquiste leader of the Montmartre contingent of the National Guard during the Paris Commune.

== The Paris Commune ==
The fall of Napoléon III in 1870 had enabled Jaclard to return to France, and the two of them entered into a common law relationship. Together with her common-law husband she participated actively in the Paris Commune of 1871. She sat on the Comité de vigilance de Montmartre (the Montmartre Committee of Vigilance) and on the committee supervising the education of girls; she was active in organising the food supply of the besieged city of Paris and being a paramedic; she co-founded and wrote for the journal La Sociale; she acted as one of the representatives of the Russian section of the International and she participated in a committee on women's rights. She was convinced that the struggle for women's rights could only succeed in conjunction with the struggle against capitalism in general. Anne Jaclard, as she was then known, collaborated closely with other leading feminist revolutionaries in the Commune, including Louise Michel, Nathalie Lemel, the writer André Léo, Paule Mink and her fellow Russian, Elisaveta Dmitrieva.

When the Paris Commune was suppressed by the Versailles government of Adolphe Thiers, Anna and Jaclard were arrested. He was sentenced to death, but she managed to escape to England, where she stayed at the home of Karl Marx. In October 1871, with the aid of Anna's father, who made a plea to Thiers, as well as her sister Sofia and her sister's husband, Jaclard was rescued from his captivity and spirited out of France to Switzerland, where he and Anna officially married. Marx, who had taught himself Russian, was at the time very interested in the Russian revolutionary movement. Anna began, but did not complete, a translation of Volume 1 of Marx's Das Kapital.

== Later years ==
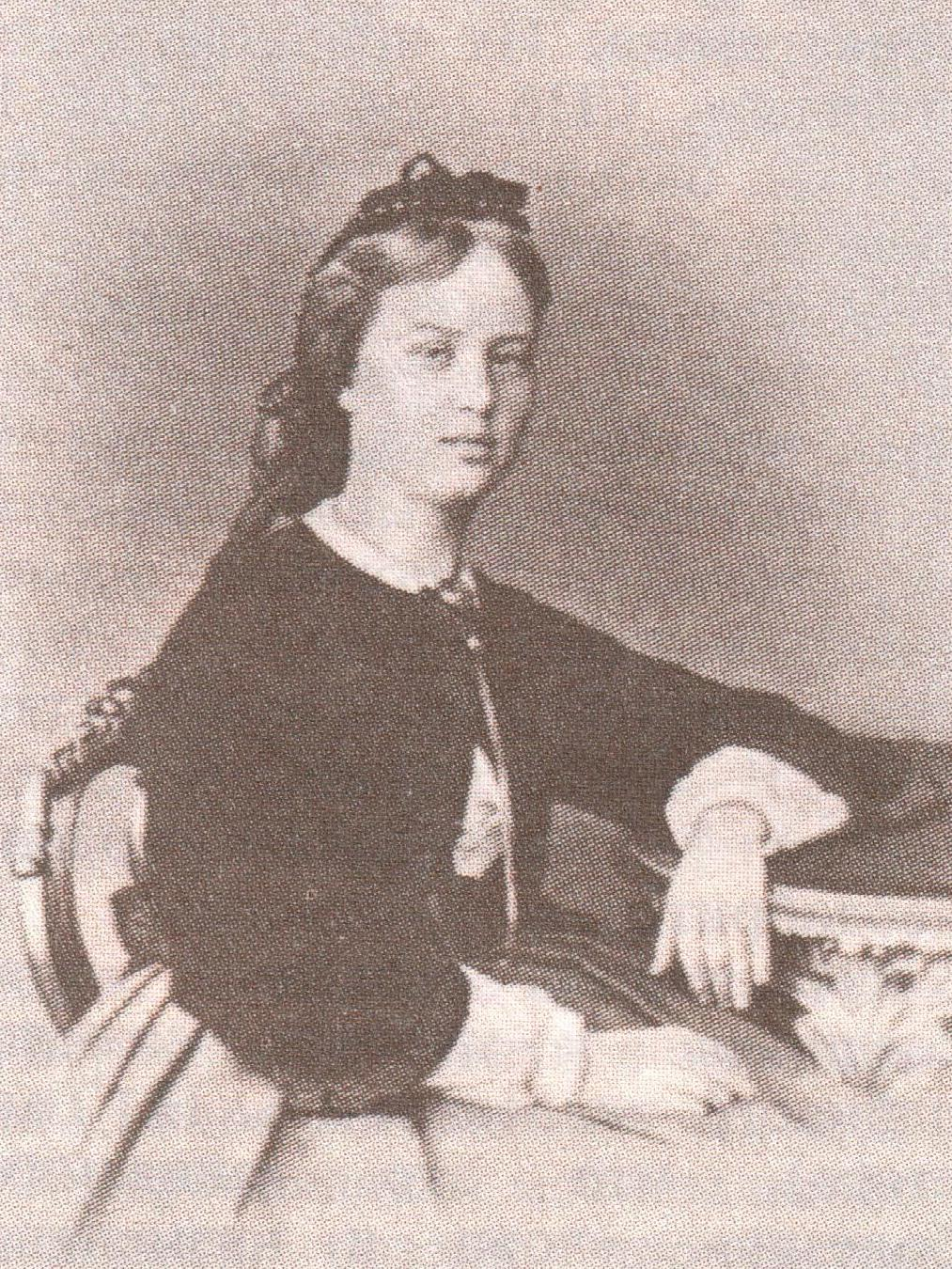
Jaclard c. 1880

In 1874, Anna and her husband returned to her native Russia. Victor found a job as a French teacher, and Anna worked primarily as a journalist and translator. She contributed to such oppositional papers as Delo and Slovo. The Jaclards also resumed friendly relations with Dostoyevsky. Neither Dostoyevsky's earlier efforts at courting Anna nor their strong political differences with the Jaclards prevented cordial and regular contact between them. She occasionally assisted him with translations into French, in which she was fluent. Anne Jaclard also resumed her contacts with revolutionary circles. She was acquainted with several members of the Narodnik movement 'to the people' in the 1870s and with the revolutionaries who, in 1879, formed the group Narodnaia Volia (The People's Will). In 1881, this group assassinated the tsar, Alexander II. However, the Jaclards had left Russia by then, and were not caught up in the repression which followed. In 1880, a general amnesty enabled Anne and Victor Jaclard to return to France. There, they resumed their journalistic work.

Anna Jaclard died on 12 September 1887 and is buried in Neuilly-sur-Seine Old Communal Cemetery in Hauts-de-Seine, France.
