= Kovalevskaya (crater) =

Crater on the Moon

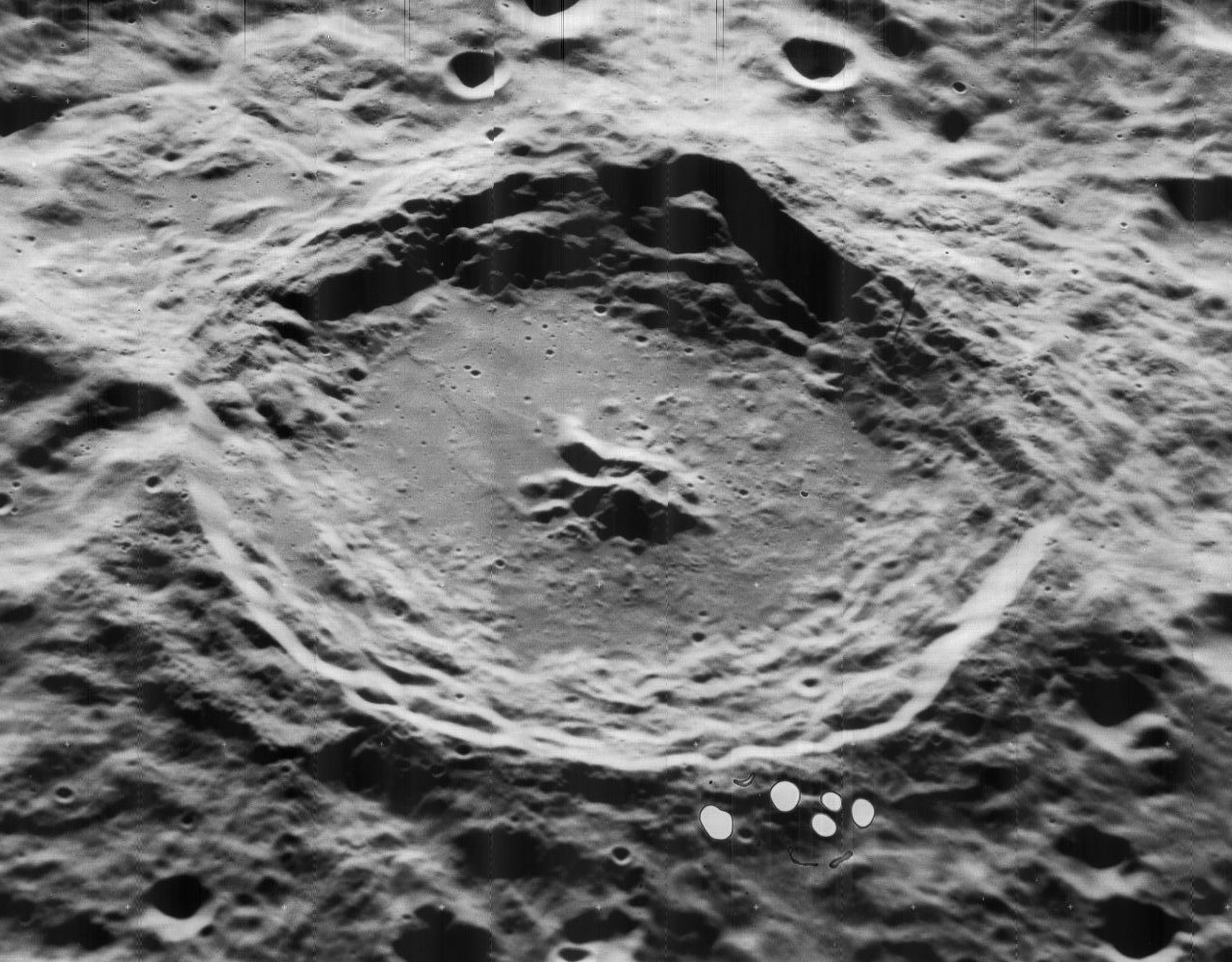
- Kovalevskaya seen by Lunar Orbiter 5
- Coordinates: 30.8°N 129.6°W
- Diameter: 115 km
- Depth: unknown
- Colongitude: 131° at sunrise
- Eponym: Sofia Kovalevskaya

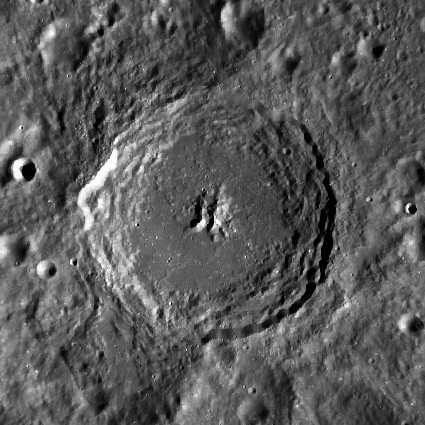
LRO image

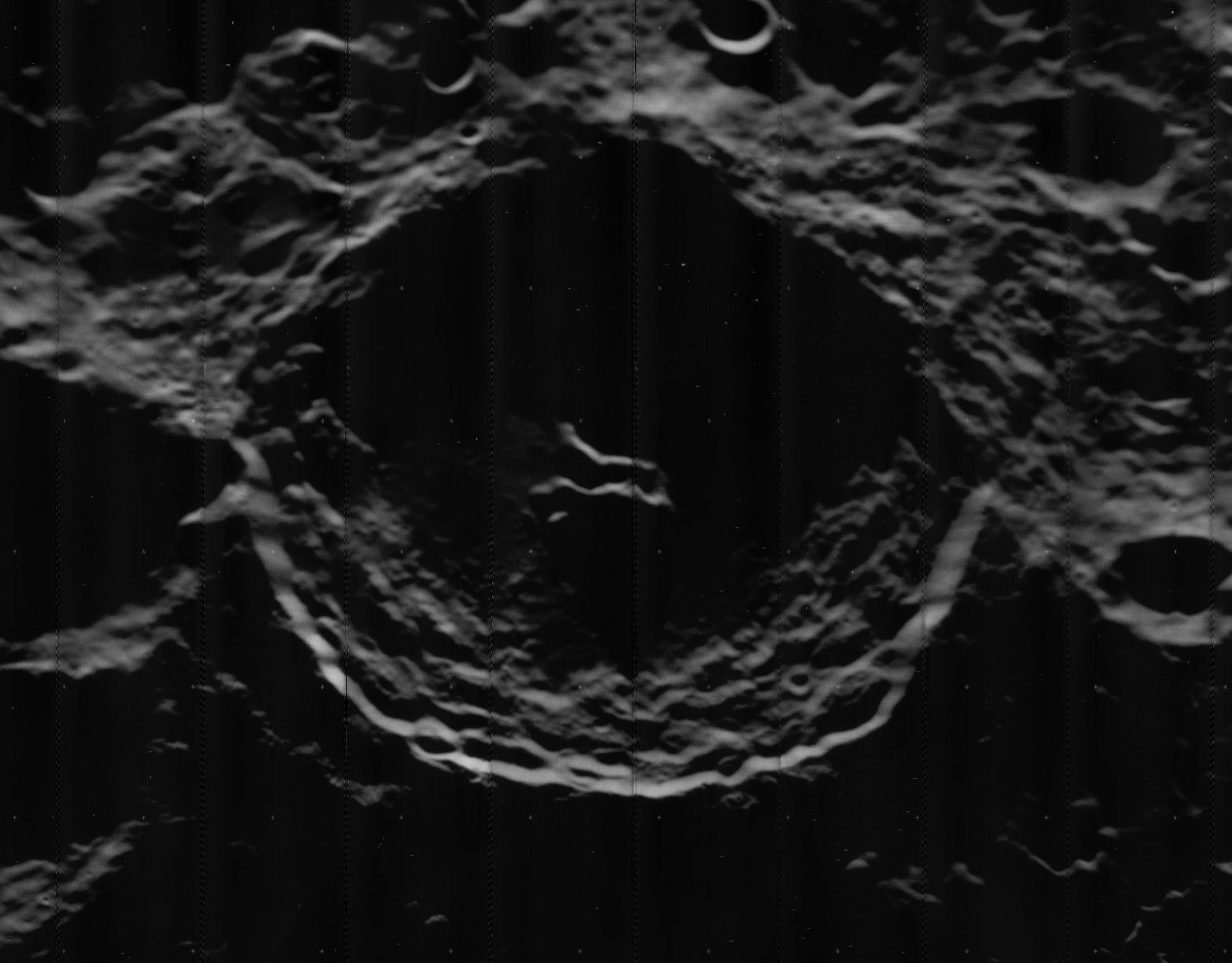
Another oblique view from Lunar Orbiter 5, with the crater at the terminator

Kovalevskaya is a prominent lunar impact crater that is located on the far side of the Moon. It lies to the southwest of the larger walled plain Landau. To the south of Kovalevskaya are the craters Poynting and Fersman.

This formation dates to the Late Imbrian epoch of the lunar geologic timescale. The crater overlies nearly half of the large Kovalevskaya Q along the southwest rim. The outer rim of Kovalevskaya is generally well-formed and not significantly eroded. The inner walls have formed terraces and slumped shelves in places.

At the midpoint of the interior floor is a pair of central peaks that are split down the middle by a valley running north–south. Some hills run to the east of these peaks, and there are some low hills near the northwest inner wall. The remainder of the floor is relatively level and free from significant impacts. The infrared spectrum of pure crystalline plagioclase has been identified on the central peak, the south and west walls, and ejecta to the west of the crater.

This feature was named after the Russian mathematician Sofia Kovalevskaya (1850–1891). The asteroid 1859 Kovalevskaya is also named in her honour.

== Satellite craters ==
By convention these features are identified on lunar maps by placing the letter on the side of the crater midpoint that is closest to Kovalevskaya.

Kovalevskaya	Latitude	Longitude	Diameter
D	32.7° N	124.4° W	21 km
Q	29.4° N	131.0° W	101 km
