= Kovalevsky =

Kovalevsky (feminine Kovalevskaya or Kovalevska) is an East Slavic surname. Notable people with the surname include:

- Anton Kavalewski, Belarusian footballer
- Alexander Onufrievich Kovalevsky, (1840–1901), Russian embryologist with a medal named for him: the A.O. Kovalevsky Medal; brother of Vladimir Onufryevich Kovalevsky below and thus brother-in-law of Sofia Kovalevskaya below, cousin of Maksim Kovalevsky below
- Anton Kovalevski, Ukrainian figure skater
- Ekaterina Kovalevskaya, Russian chess player
- Jean Kovalevsky (1929–2018), French astronomer
- Maksim Kovalevsky (1851–1916), Russian sociologist, cousin of Vladimir Onufryevich Kovalevsky below and thus cousin-in-law of Sofia Kovalevskaya below and cousin of Alexander Onufrievich Kovalevsky above
- Maria Kovalevska, (1849–1889), Ukrainian Narodnik
- Sofia Kovalevskaya (1850–1891), Russian mathematician, wife of Vladimir Onufryevich Kovalevsky below and thus sister-in-law of Alexander Onufrievich Kovalevsky above and cousin-in-law of Maksim Kovalevsky above
- Vladimir Antonovich Kovalevsky (born 1927) Ukrainian and German physicist
- Vladimir Ivanovich Kovalevsky (1848–1935), Russian statesman
- Vladimir Onufryevich Kovalevsky (1842–1883), Russian paleontologist who worked with Charles Darwin; cousin of Maksim Kovalevsky above, brother of Alexander Onufrievich Kovalevsky and husband of Sofia Kovalevskaya above
