= Free radical (disambiguation) =

A free radical is an atomic or molecular species with unpaired electrons on an otherwise open shell configuration.

Free Radical may also refer to:

== Chemistry ==
- Free Radical Centre, a research center located in Australia that works in all areas of free radical chemistry
- Free-radical theory of aging

== Arts and entertainment ==
Film

- Free Radicals (1979 film), an American animated short by Len Lye
- Free Radicals (2003 film) (German: Böse Zellen), an Austrian film by Barbara Albert

Literature and publications

- Free Radical (magazine), a New Zealand-based magazine
- "Free Radicals" (short story), by Alice Munro
- Free Radicals: The Secret Anarchy of Science, a book by Michael Brooks

Music

- Free Radicals (band), an American band
- "Free Radicals", a song by American rock band The Flaming Lips on the album At War with the Mystics

Video games

- Free Radical Design, a British video game developer
