= Comstock (crater) =

Lunar impact crater

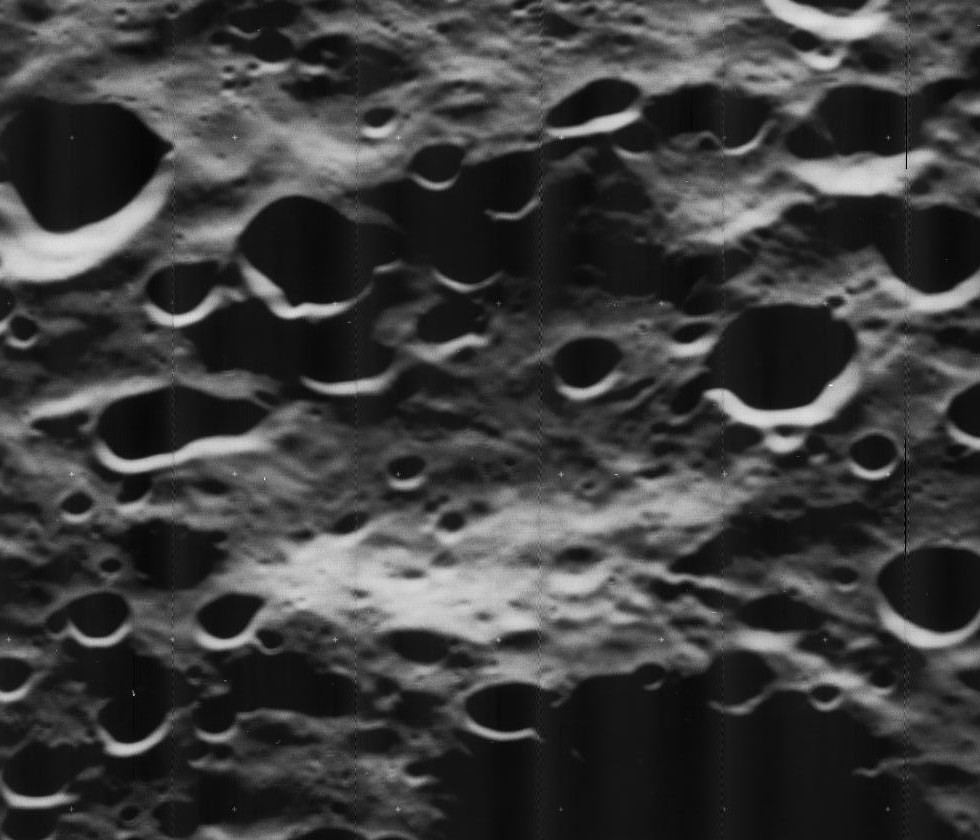
- Oblique Lunar Orbiter 5 image
- Coordinates: 21.8°N 121.5°W
- Diameter: 73.23 km (45.50 mi)
- Depth: Unknown
- Colongitude: 122° at sunrise
- Eponym: George C. Comstock

Comstock is a degraded lunar impact crater that is located on the far side of the Moon. It lies to the northeast of the walled plain Fersman, and north of the crater Weyl.

This is a heavily eroded crater formation with several smaller craters lying long the rim and inner wall. The largest of these crosses the northern rim and inner wall. A cluster of small craters lie across the south-southwest rim and inner wall. The interior floor is marked by several tiny craterlets, and traces of ray material from the crater Ohm to the east-southeast.

This crater is named after American astronomer George C. Comstock (1855–1934). Its designation was officially adopted by the International Astronomical Union in 1970.

== Satellite craters ==
By convention these features are identified on lunar maps by placing the letter on the side of the crater midpoint that is closest to Comstock.

Comstock	Latitude	Longitude	Diameter
A	24.8° N	121.2° W	21 km
P	20.1° N	122.7° W	26 km
