= Kamerlingh Onnes (crater) =

Crater on the Moon

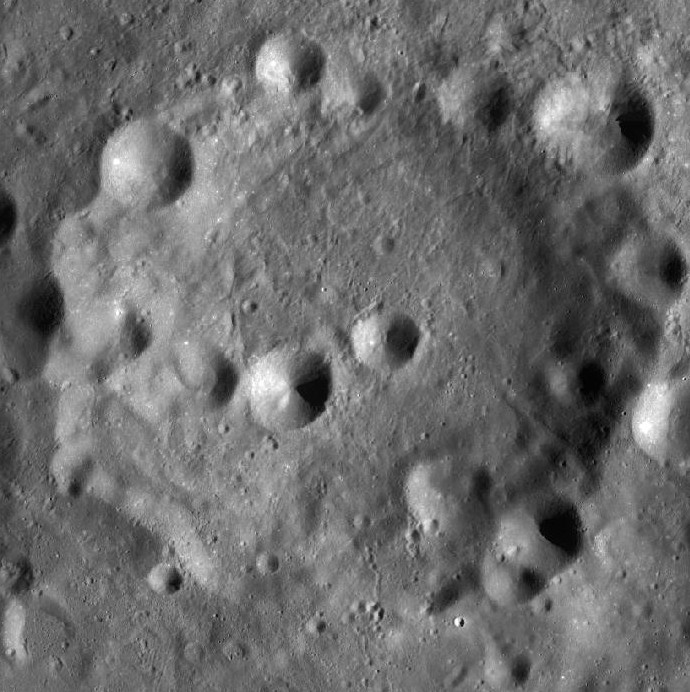
- LRO WAC image
- Coordinates: 15.0°N 115.8°W
- Diameter: 66 km (41 mi)
- Depth: Unknown
- Colongitude: 117° at sunrise
- Eponym: Heike K. Onnes

Kamerlingh Onnes is a lunar impact crater on the far side of the Moon. It lies less than a crater diameter to the north-northwest of the crater Kolhörster. North of Kamerlingh Onnes lies Shternberg and to the northwest is Weyl.

This is a worn and eroded crater formation that is slightly elongated along the east–west direction, giving it a somewhat oval shape. A number of small craters lie along the rim, particularly along the northern side. The interior floor is marked only by a few small craterlets, and some ray material from the crater Ohm to the northeast.
