= Too Much Happiness =

2009 short story collection by Alice Munro

- First edition cover design
- Author: Alice Munro
- Language: English
- Genre: Short story collection
- Publisher: Douglas Gibson Books
- Publication date: 25 August 2009
- Publication place: Canada
- Media type: Print (hardcover)
- Pages: 320 pp
- ISBN: 978-0-7710-6529-3
- OCLC: 317743569

Too Much Happiness is a short story collection by Canadian writer Alice Munro, published on August 25, 2009 by McClelland and Stewart's Douglas Gibson Books imprint. The title story is a fictional retelling of the life of the 19th century Russian mathematician and writer Sofia Kovalevskaya. The book contains ten short stories. Each story outlines the core of its protagonist by narrating selected scenes of that character's life.

== Synopsis ==
There are 10 stories in total: Dimensions, Fiction, Wenlock Edge, Deep-Holes, Free Radicals, Face, Some Women, Child's Play, Wood, and the titular story.

Dimensions focuses on a young girl, Doree, and her relationship with an abusive older man, Lloyd.

Fiction focuses on a woman, Joyce, and her grappling with changing relationships.

Wenlock Edge focuses on an unnamed protagonist, who is sexually abused.

Deep-Holes focuses on Sally, whose son lives a monastic lifestyle after a traumatic experience.

Free Radicals focuses on Nita, an elderly woman who has to deal with a home intruder.

Face focuses on a boy with a birthmark across his face.

Some Women focuses on the carer of an ill man.

Child's Play focuses on two girls at their summer camp.

Wood focuses on Roy, who obsesses over wood-cutting.
