= 1859 Kovalevskaya =

Carbonaceous main-belt asteroid

Discovery
- Discovered by: L. V. Zhuravleva
- Discovery site: Crimean Astrophysical Obs.
- Discovery date: 4 September 1972

Designations
- Named after: Sofia Kovalevskaya (Russian mathematician)
- Alternative designations: 1972 RS_{2} · 1932 RD; 1941 BQ · 1942 HH; 1949 PU · 1949 QW; 1950 TM_{4} · 1953 EK_{1} 1966 PC_{1} · A915 TK
- Minor planet category: main-belt · (outer)

Orbital characteristics
- Epoch 4 September 2017 (JD 2458000.5)
- Uncertainty parameter 0
- Observation arc: 101.37 yr (37,027 days)
- Aphelion: 3.5272 AU
- Perihelion: 2.8909 AU
- Semi-major axis: 3.2091 AU
- Eccentricity: 0.0991
- Orbital period (sidereal): 5.75 yr (2,100 days)
- Mean anomaly: 38.805°
- Mean motion: 0° 10^{m} 17.04^{s} / day
- Inclination: 7.7011°
- Longitude of ascending node: 343.30°
- Argument of perihelion: 244.92°

Physical characteristics
- Dimensions: 34.40 km (calculated); 44.634±0.097; 46.02±1.6 km (IRAS:14); 48.798±0.424 km
- Synodic rotation period: 11.1084±0.0066 h
- Geometric albedo: 0.0427±0.0077; 0.053±0.006; 0.057 (assumed); 0.0694±0.005 (IRAS:14)
- Spectral type: C
- Absolute magnitude (H): 10.6 · 10.7 · 11.05 · 11.1084±0.0066 (R)

1859 Kovalevskaya, provisional designation 1972 RS_{2}, is a carbonaceous asteroid from the outer regions of the asteroid belt, approximately 40 kilometers in diameter.

It was discovered on 4 September 1972, by Russian–Ukrainian astronomer Lyudmila Zhuravleva at the Crimean Astrophysical Observatory in Nauchnyj, on the Crimean peninsula. The asteroid was named after Russian mathematician Sofia Kovalevskaya.

== Orbit and classification ==
Kovalevskaya orbits the Sun in the outer main-belt at a distance of 2.9–3.5 AU once every 5 years and 9 months (2,100 days). Its orbit has an eccentricity of 0.10 and an inclination of 8° with respect to the ecliptic.

It was first identified as A915 TK at Heidelberg Observatory in 1915, extending the asteroid's observation arc by 57 years prior to its official discovery observation at Nauchnyj.

== Physical characteristics ==
Kovalevskaya has been characterized as a dark C-type asteroid.

=== Lightcurves ===
In September 2013, photometric observations at the Palomar Transient Factory, California, gave a rotational lightcurve with a period of 11.1084±0.0066 hours and a brightness variation of 0.13 in magnitude (U=2).

=== Diameter and albedo ===
According to the surveys carried out by the Infrared Astronomical Satellite (IRAS) and the NEOWISE mission of NASA's Wide-field Infrared Survey Explorer, Kovalevskaya measures between 44.6 and 48.8 kilometers in diameter, and its surface has a low albedo between 0.043 and 0.069.

The Collaborative Asteroid Lightcurve Link assumes a standard albedo for carbonaceous asteroids of 0.057 and calculates a smaller diameter of 34.4 kilometers with an absolute magnitude of 11.05.

== Naming ==
This minor planet was named after Russian mathematician Sofia Kovalevskaya (1850–1891), who has made important contributions to partial differential equations and rigid body motion. The lunar crater Kovalevskaya is also named after her. The official naming citation was published by the Minor Planet Center on 1 June 1975 (M.P.C. 3826).

From 1972 to 1992, the discoverer of this asteroid, Lyudmila Zhuravleva, has made more than 200 minor planets discoveries, and ranks 61st on the Minor Planet Center discoverer chart.
