= Shternberg (crater) =

Crater on the Moon

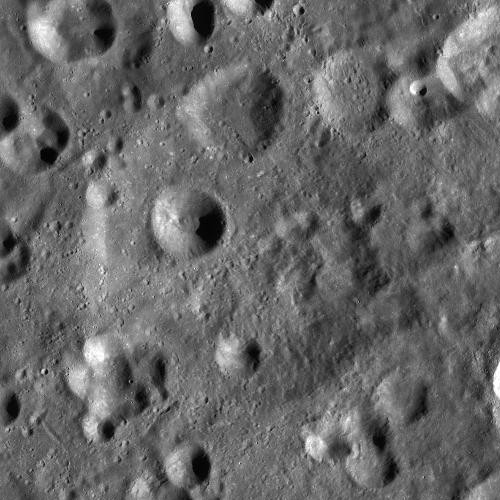
- LRO WAC image
- Coordinates: 19.5°N 116.3°E
- Diameter: 70 km (43 mi)
- Depth: Unknown
- Colongitude: 117° at sunrise
- Eponym: Pavel K. Shternberg

Shternberg is an eroded lunar impact crater on the Moon's far side. It lies just to the west-northwest of the crater Ohm, and is completely covered by higher-albedo material from the ray system that surrounds Ohm. To the west-southwest of Shternberg is Weyl, and to the west-northwest is Comstock. Less than one crater diameter to the northeast of Shternberg is Comrie.

This crater has been heavily worn and eroded by subsequent impacts. A small crater overlies the northern rim and there is a short arc of smaller craters running south of this impact across the interior floor of Shternberg. The rim has also been damaged along the eastern side and to the southwest. The interior floor is pock-marked by a number of small craterlets.

In some older sources this crater is listed as Sternberg.

== Satellite craters ==
By convention these features are identified on lunar maps by placing the letter on the side of the crater midpoint that is closest to Shternberg.

Shternberg	Latitude	Longitude	Diameter
C	20.9° N	114.3° W	29 km
