= Tula electoral district =

Constituency of the Russian Republic

Tula
- Former Civilian constituency for the All-Russian Constituent Assembly
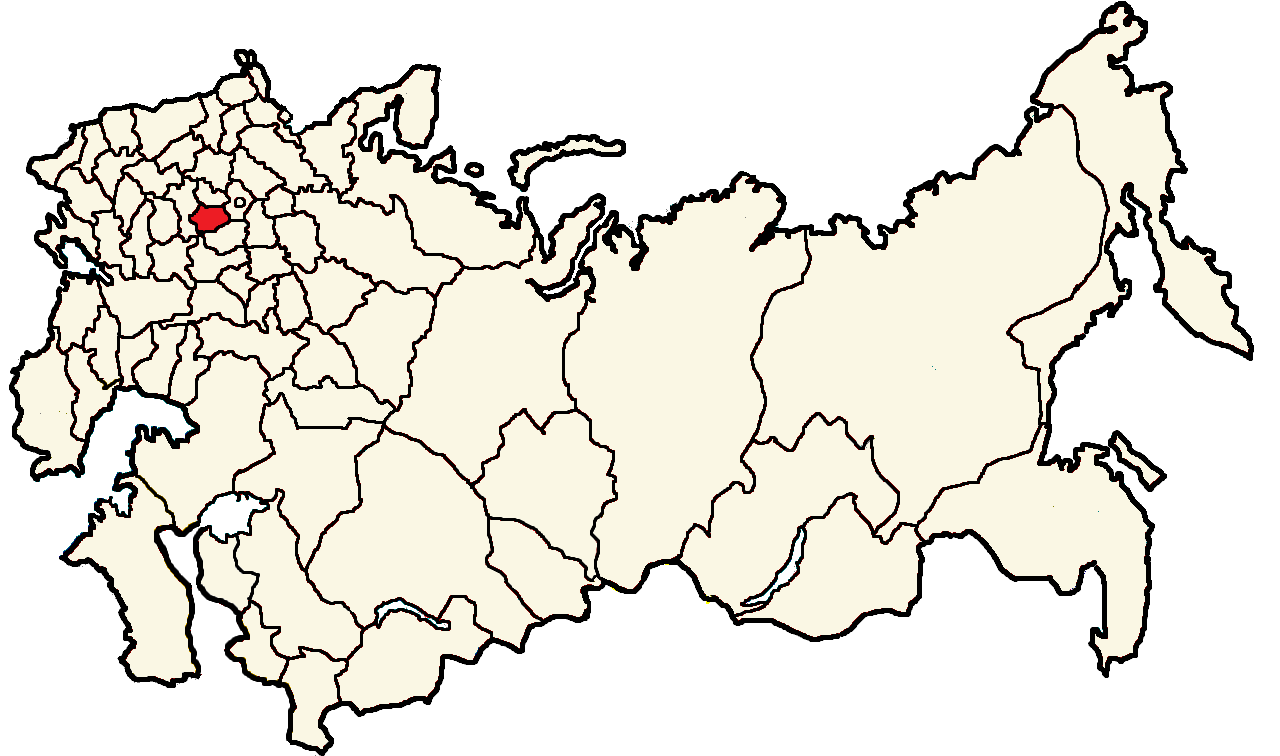

Former constituency
- Created: 1917
- Abolished: 1918
- Number of members: 8
- Number of Uyezd Electoral Commissions: 12
- Number of Urban Electoral Commissions: 1
- Number of Parishes: 266

The Tula electoral district (Russian: Тульский избирательный округ) was a constituency created for the 1917 Russian Constituent Assembly election. The electoral district covered the Tula Governorate. The city of Tula was a major metallurgical industrial centre, located close to Moscow.

The account of U.S. historian Oliver Henry Radkey, who is the source for the results table below, has a complete vote count from the city of Tula and 10 out 12 uezds are complete. The votes from Yefremov uezd and one of the volosts of Odoyev uezd are not covered in Radkey's account.

== Results ==
Tula
Party	Vote	%	Seats
List 5 - Bolsheviks	219,337	45.93	4
List 1 - Socialist-Revolutionaries	216,267	45.28	4
List 2 - Kadets	21,298	4.46	
List 4 - Mensheviks	9,605	2.01	
List 7 - Commercial-Industrial	6,624	1.39	
List 6 - Popular Socialists	1,832	0.38	
List 9 - Cooperative	1,294	0.27	
List 3 - Peasants of Basavsk volost	770	0.16	
List 8 - Menshevik-Internationalists	550	0.12	
Total:	477,577		8

Deputies Elected
Arvatov	SR
Gurevich	SR
Medvedev	SR
Nearonov	SR
Kaminsky	Bolshevik
Kaul	Bolshevik
Kolesnikov	Bolshevik
Yakovleva	Bolshevik
