= Pavel Shternberg =

Russian astronomer and academic

- Па́вел Ште́рнберг
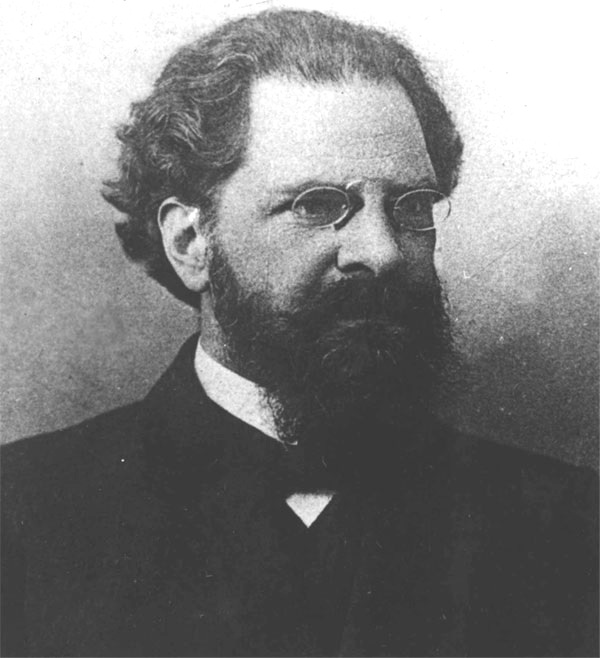
- Born: 2 April 1865; Oryol, Russian Empire
- Died: 1 February 1920 (aged 54); Moscow, Russian Soviet Federative Socialist Republic
- Education: Imperial Moscow University; Moscow State University
- Spouse: Varvara Yakovleva
- Awards: Medal of the Russian Geographical Society
- Scientific career
- Fields: Astronomy
- Workplaces: Moscow State University
- Academic advisors: Fyodor Bredikhin

Pavel Karlovich Shternberg (Russian: Павел Карлович Штернберг; April 2, [O.S. March 21] 1865 – February 1, 1920) was a Russian professor, academic, astronomer, and Bolshevik revolutionary of German descent. Shternberg contributed to the abolition of the Tsarist government by Alexander Kerensky during the February Revolution of 1917. He was an acquaintance of two notable revolutionaries, Vladimir Lenin and Leon Trotsky.

== Life and career ==
Pavel Shternberg was born in Oryol, one of eleven children of a railway contractor. His father was a German immigrant and a subject of Duchy of Braunschweig who used to be a merchant. He studied mathematics and physics at Moscow University, where he showed exceptional ability in astronomy. His work included processing on the data on Jupiter's Great Red Spot. His significant astronomical contributions include discovery of the planetary perturbations, the measurement of the latitude of the Moscow Astronomical Observatory, and the application of photography to astronomy. The primary subject of his astrophotography was capturing double stars. In 1914, he was appointed a professor of Moscow University. In 1916, he was appointed head of the Moscow Observatory.

Unusually, as well as being one of the leading Russian scientists of his day, Shternberg was an active revolutionary. Varvara Yakovleva, his future wife, who was a teenage mathematics student in a Moscow women's college, is credited with persuading him to join Bolshevik faction of the Russian Social Democratic Labour Party in 1905. During the 1905 revolution, he hid weapons in his laboratory that were used during the armed Moscow rising. As an eminent academic, he was above suspicion, and stayed in post after the revolution had been suppressed. After the February Revolution, he took part in the meeting of Moscow Bolsheviks that led to the formation of Red Guards. He was in command of the heavy artillery deployed to attack the Kremlin during the Moscow Bolshevik Uprising, when the Bolsheviks seized power in November. As the only eminent academic apart from Mikhail Pokrovsky to support the Bolshevik Revolution, he played a leading role in forming the new government's policies in higher education. During the Russian Civil War, he volunteered to act a front line political commissar and was a member of the Military Revolutionary Committee of the Eastern Front.

In January 1918, the provincial commissioner and professor of the Higher Courses for Women, Pavel Sternberg, issued a security certificate to the collection of the State Darwin Museum. In March 1918, concurrently, he was appointed a member of the Collegium of the People's Commissariat of Education and head of the Department of Higher Education. In July 1918, he took part in the preparation and holding of the Meeting of University Workers on the Reform of Higher Education.

In November 1919, the car in which he was travelling fell through the ice into a river in Siberia. Despite being rushed back to Moscow for treatment, he died of pleurisy. He was buried at the Vagankovo Cemetery in Moscow.

== Legacy ==
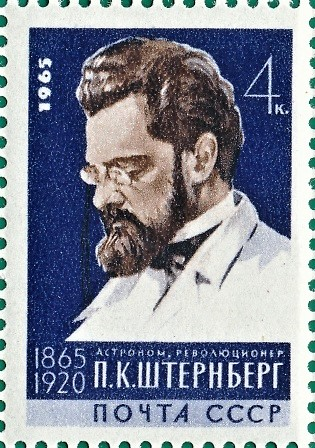
Soviet 1965 commemorative stamp featuring Karl Shternberg

The Shternberg Astronomical Institute, and the lunar crater Shternberg, are named after him.
