= George Comstock (astronomer) =

American astronomer (1855-1934)

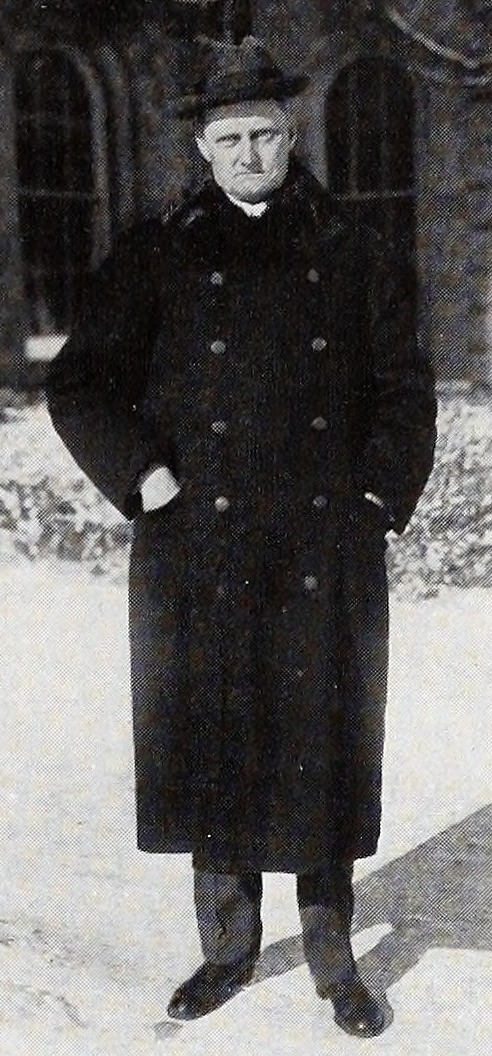
- Born: George Cary Comstock; February 12, 1855; Madison, Wisconsin
- Died: May 11, 1934 (aged 79); Madison, Wisconsin
- Burial place: Forest Hill Cemetery
- Education: University of Michigan
- Occupations: Astronomer, educator
- Spouse: Esther Cecile Everett (m. 1894)

George Cary Comstock (February 12, 1855 – May 11, 1934) was an American astronomer and educator.

== Biography ==
George Comstock was born in Madison, Wisconsin on February 12, 1855, the eldest child of Charles Henry Comstock and Mercy Bronson. In 1877 he was awarded a Ph.B. from the University of Michigan, after studying mathematics and astronomy. For a couple of years he worked for the U.S. Lake Survey and then a Mississippi River improvement project, before joining Washburn Observatory as the assistant director in 1879. As career insurance, during his free moments he studied law and was admitted to the Wisconsin bar in 1883 after graduating from Wisconsin law school. However, he would never practice the legal profession.

He was appointed professor at Ohio State University in 1887, where he taught mathematics and astronomy, and he took over directorship of the Washburn Observatory. On June 12, 1894, he was married to Esther Cecile Everett, and the couple had a daughter, Mary Cecelia Comstock Carey. He helped organize the American Astronomical Society in 1897, serving first as secretary and later as vice president. He was elected to the National Academy of Sciences in 1899. In 1904 he was appointed first chair of the University of Wisconsin graduate school, later becoming Dean. He held this position until 1920, then retired in 1922 as Professor Emeritus of Astronomy. In 1925 he became president of the American Astronomical Society.

During his career he wrote several textbooks and published articles in scientific journals. The crater Comstock on the far side of the Moon is named after him. His brother Louis became Chairman of the Board at New York Title Insurance Company.

George Comstock died in Madison on May 11, 1934, and was buried at Forest Hill Cemetery.
