= Victor Jaclard =

French socialist (1840–1903)

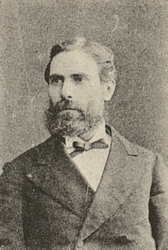
Victor Jaclard

Charles Victor Jaclard (18 December 1840 – 14 April 1903) was a French revolutionary socialist, a member of the First International and of the Paris Commune. Jaclard is noted for his political adaptability and the ease with which he maintained good personal as well as political relations with representatives of very different, and in some cases mutually hostile, ideological tendencies: Blanquism, Proudhonism, Bakuninism, Marxism, Clemenceauvian Radicalism and Boulangism. His common-law wife was a Russian socialist and feminist revolutionary, Anna Korvin-Krukovskaya, sister of the mathematician and socialist Sofia Kovalevskaya.

== Early life ==
Charles Victor Jaclard was born on 18 December 1840 in Metz. He came from a humble working-class family, but, as a precocious student, he was given a good education. After working as a military nurse and then a mathematics teacher, he moved to Paris in 1864 to pursue further studies in medicine. He soon fell in with the followers of the veteran revolutionary Louis Auguste Blanqui and joined the Blanquists' secret society. In 1865 he helped organise Blanqui's escape from prison to Belgium. That year, Jaclard attended the International Student Congress in Liège, where he attended speeches expounding atheism and socialism. On 26 December, the French Council of Universities banned him from all French universities because of his politics, particularly a speech he gave at Brussels on 3 November, in which he declared that there would be a new Congress, "held in the streets, and concluded by our rifles."

== Later life and death ==
Anna Jaclard died in 1887. Victor Jaclard married a second time, on 12 July 1894, to 25-year-old Joséphine Eugénie Desprès. Jaclard died on 14 April 1903 in Paris and was cremated at Père-Lachaise Cemetery.

Although Jaclard had not spent much of his time practising medicine, he seems to have remained a doctor in good standing in the eyes of his profession. At any rate, the British Medical Journal of 2 May 1903, noted his recent death.
