= Kekulé (crater) =

Lunar impact crater

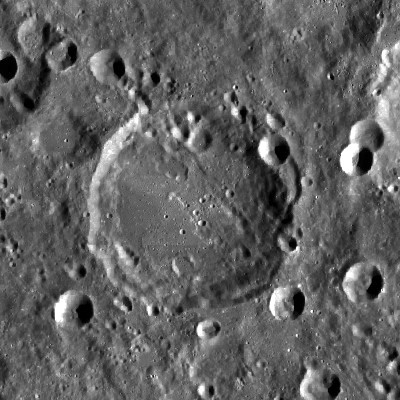
- LRO image
- Coordinates: 16.4°N 138.1°W
- Diameter: 94 km
- Depth: Unknown
- Colongitude: 139° at sunrise
- Eponym: F. A. Kekulé von Stradonitz

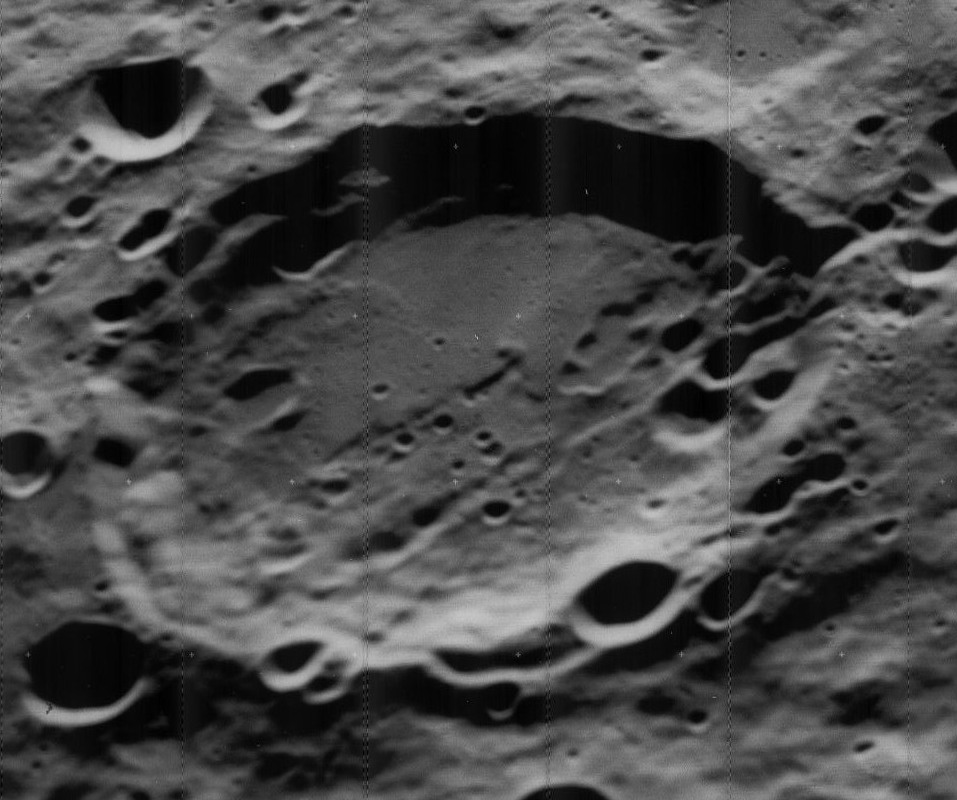
Oblique Lunar Orbiter 5 image

Kekulé is a lunar impact crater on the far side of the Moon. It lies just to the west-southwest of the larger crater Poynting, on the edge of the ejecta skirt surrounding the walled plain called Hertzsprung to the southeast.

The outer rim of Kekulé displays some degradation due to impact erosion, but is for the most part intact. The rim is roughly circular, with the greatest wear along the northeast rim. There a small crater lies along the rim edge. The interior floor is relatively level with no central peak, but there are some irregularities in the surface in the northeastern half and along the southern edge. There are a number of tiny craterlets pitting the interior, and a pair of small craterlets along the northern inner wall.

== Satellite craters ==
By convention these features are identified on lunar maps by placing the letter on the side of the crater midpoint that is closest to Kekulé.

| Kekulé | Latitude | Longitude | Diameter |
|---|---|---|---|
| K | 13.9° N | 135.8° W | 16 km |
| M | 12.2° N | 137.4° W | 19 km |
| S | 15.4° N | 143.0° W | 21 km |
| V | 18.4° N | 142.0° W | 67 km |
