= Alexander Kovalevsky =

Russian embryologist (1840–1901)

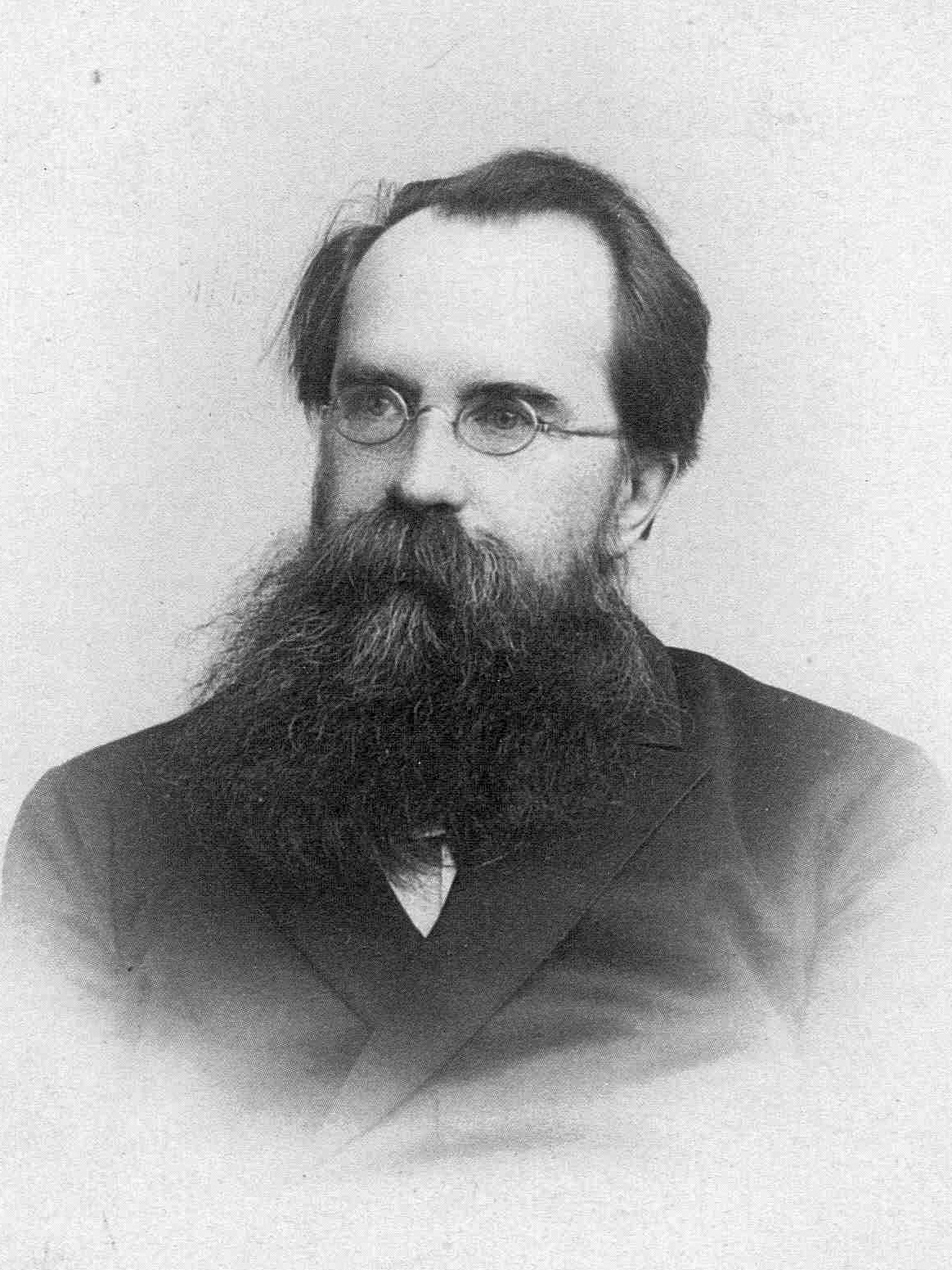
- Alexander Kovalevsky
- Born: 7 November 1840; Vārkava, Vitebsk Governorate, Russian Empire
- Died: 1901 (aged 60–61); St. Petersburg, Russian Empire
- Education: University of Heidelberg
- Known for: Gastrulation
- Scientific career
- Fields: Embryology

Alexander Onufrievich Kovalevsky (Russian: Алекса́ндр Ону́фриевич Ковале́вский; 7 November 1840 – 1901) was a Russian embryologist, who studied medicine at the University of Heidelberg and became professor at the University of St Petersburg. He was the brother of the paleontologist Vladimir Kovalevsky, and the brother-in-law of the mathematician Sofya Kovalevskaya.

== Discoveries ==
A. Lancelet (a chordate), B. Larval tunicate, C. Adult tunicate. Kovalevsky saw that the notochord (1) and gill slit (5) are features shared by tunicates and vertebrates.

Kowalevsky's family (of the Dołęga coat of arms) belonged to Ruthenian nobility.

He showed that all animals go through a period of gastrulation.

Kovalevsky discovered that tunicates are not molluscs, but that their larval stage has a notochord and pharyngeal slits, like vertebrates. Further, these structures develop from the same germ layers in the embryo as the equivalent structures in vertebrates, so he argued that the tunicates should be grouped with the vertebrates as chordates. 19th-century zoology thus converted embryology into an evolutionary science, connecting phylogeny with homologies between the germ layers of embryos, foreshadowing evolutionary developmental biology.

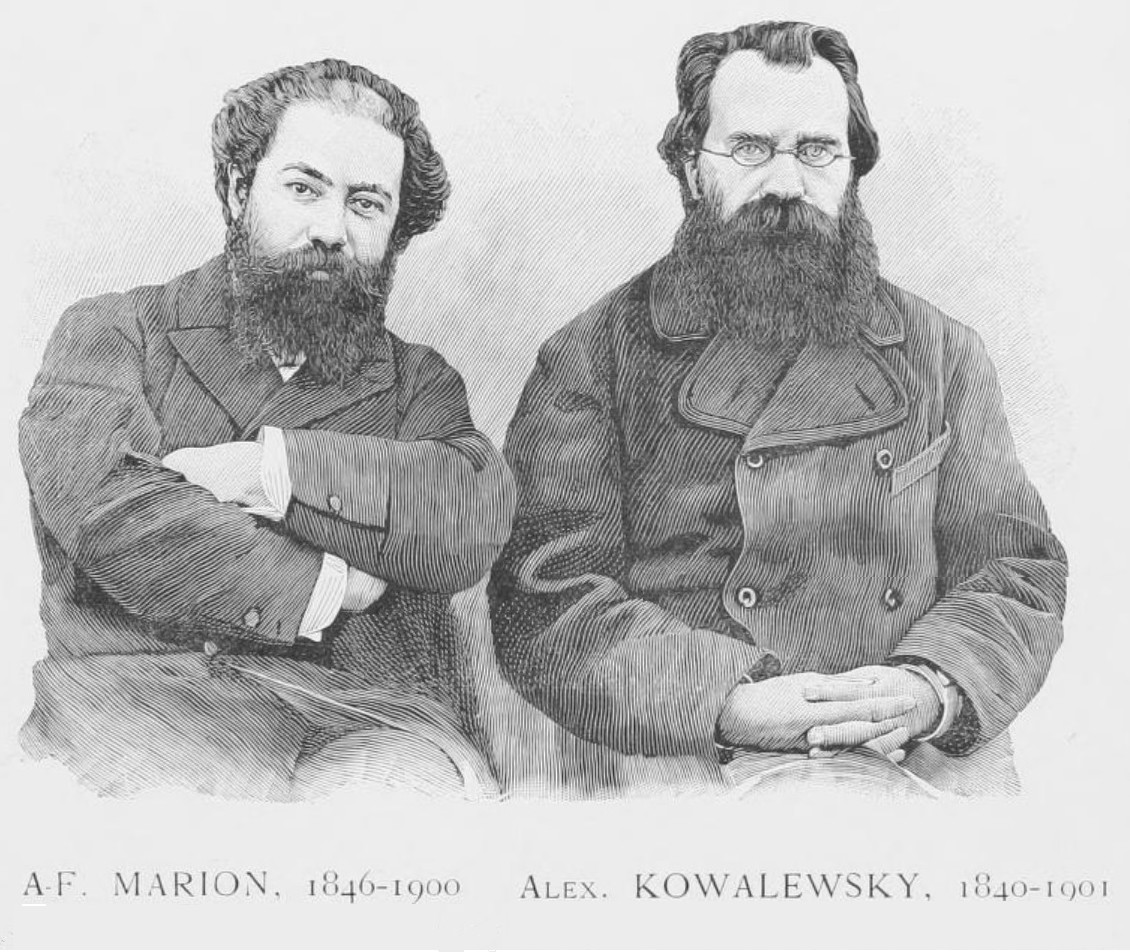
Antoine Fortuné Marion and Alexander Kovalevsky, founder and collaborator of the Annals of Natural History Museum of Marseille

== Honors ==
He was elected on the 1st of May 1884 a Foreign Member of the Linnean Society of London. The St. Petersburg Society of Naturalists annually awards the A.O. Kovalevsky Medal.

== Bibliography ==
- Kowalevsky, A (1901). "Les Hedylidés, étude anatomique". Zapiski Imperatorskoi Akademii Nauk. 12: 1–32.
