= Poynting (lunar crater) =

Crater on the Moon

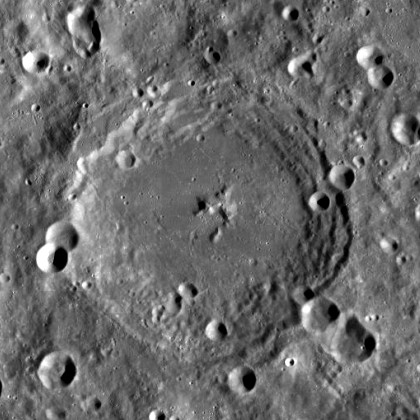
- LRO image
- Coordinates: 18.1°N 133.4°W
- Diameter: 128 km
- Depth: Unknown
- Colongitude: 135° at sunrise
- Eponym: John H. Poynting

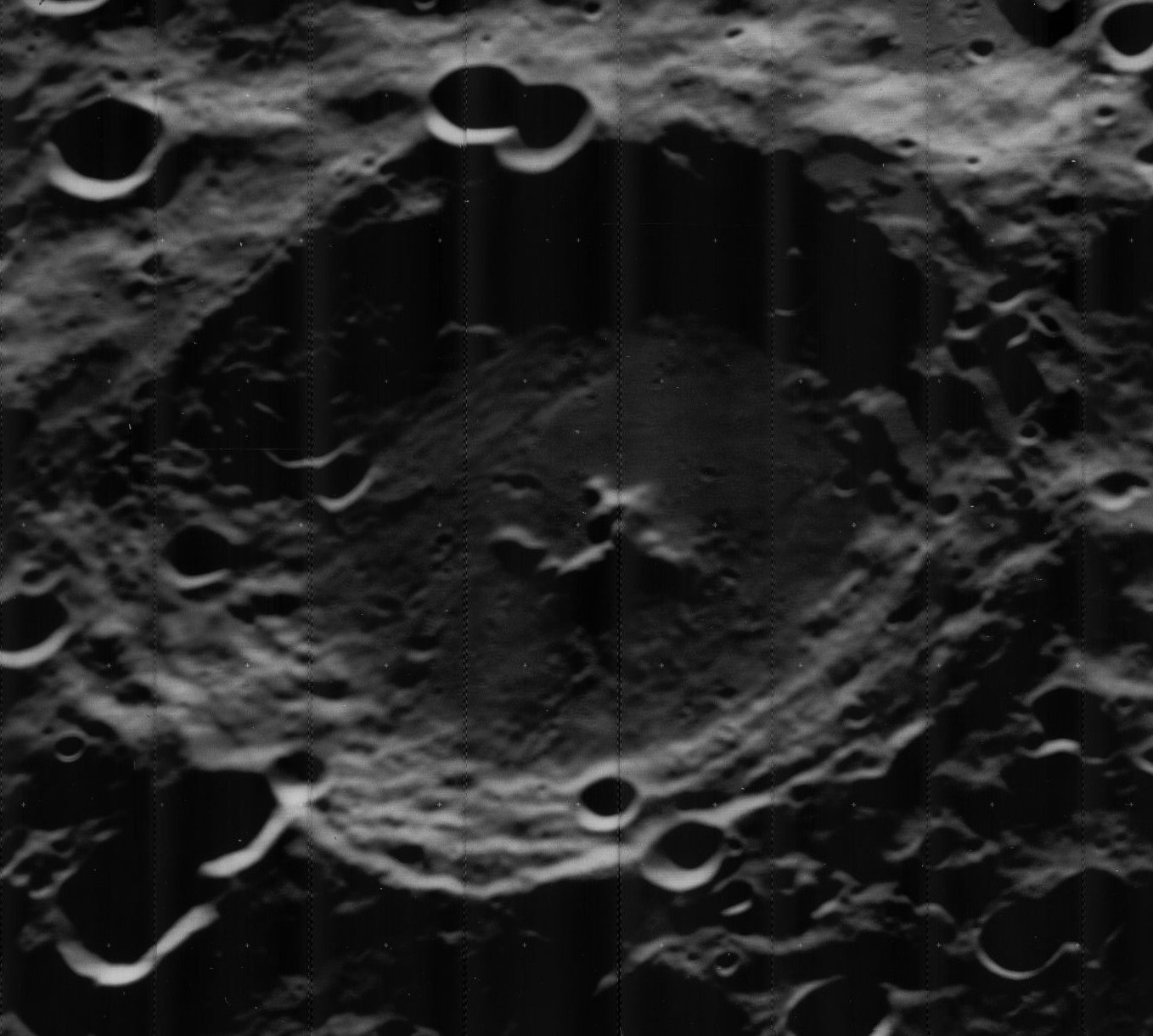
Oblique Lunar Orbiter 5 image

Poynting is a large lunar impact crater located on the far side of the Moon. It is located to the north-northwest of the walled plain Hertzsprung, with the crater Fersman immediately to the east and Kekulé equally near to the west-southwest.

This crater has undergone some erosion, and several small craters lie across the rim and inner wall. A pair of these lie next to each other along the eastern side, and another pair on the western rim. Across the southeast rim is a nearly merged crater pair. Parts of the rim remain well-defined, however, including the east and north where there are some terraces. The rim is generally circular, with a slight inward intrusion along the northwest.

The interior floor is relatively level, except for a central peak ridge located slightly to the east of the midpoint. There are small craterlets on the floor near the south and northwest edge, and a number of small craters. The infrared spectrum of pure crystalline plagioclase has been identified on the central peak and the southwest floor.

The feature is named for the English physicist John Henry Poynting (1852–1914), who also has a (somewhat smaller) crater named after him in the Tharsis region of Mars.

== Satellite craters ==
By convention these features are identified on lunar maps by placing the letter on the side of the crater midpoint that is closest to Poynting.

Poynting	Latitude	Longitude	Diameter
X	23.3° N	136.2° W	22 km
