= Vladimir Kovalevsky (paleontologist) =

Russian paleontologist

- Владимир Ковалевский
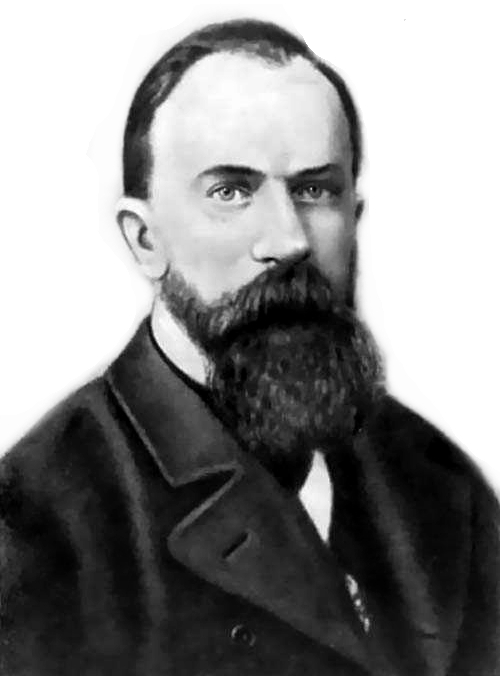
- Vladimir Kovalevsky, c. 1881
- Born: 14 August 1842; Vārkava, Vitebsk Governorate, Russian Empire
- Died: 15 April 1883 (aged 40); Moscow, Russian Empire
- Spouse: Sofya Korvin-Krukovskaya (m. 1868)
- Scientific career
- Fields: Paleontology

Vladimir Onufrievich Kovalevsky (Russian: Влади́мир Ону́фриевич Ковале́вский; 14 August [O.S. 2 August] 1842 – 27 April [O.S. 15 April] 1883) was a Russian academic and paleontologist. One of the first adopters of Charles Darwin in Russia, he is most notable for his early work on the evolution of Hippomorpha. He was the brother of Alexander Kovalevsky. He married Sofia Kovalevskaya, and had a daughter named Sofia, nicknamed 'Fufa'. After spending some years together as a couple, Vladimir, financially ruined, a victim of depression and unable to support his wife and daughter, committed suicide.

== Early life ==
Vladimir Kovalevsky was born in the Dvinsky Uyezd of Vitebsk Governorate, outside of Palibino, the youngest of two children. His father, Onufry Osipovich Kovalevsky, was a Russianized Polish noble landowner and his mother, Polina Petrovna, was Russian. He spent his entire childhood at the estate, and was tutored until the age of 16. He had a grounding in foreign languages, and during his last year at Imperial School of Jurisprudence he earned money by translating books. After graduating in 1861, he gained employment at the Department of Heraldry but asked to travel abroad for his health. After traveling to Heidelberg, Tübingen, Paris, and Nice, he settled in London where he taught the daughter of exiled radical Alexander Herzen. This attracted the attention of the agents of the tzar. When he returned home, he published many scientific texts and, in 1866, Herzen's "Who is to Blame" of which the entire printing was burned by order of the censors. After his engagement to a young radical woman was broken, he met Sofia Kovalevskaya (née Korvin-Krukovskaya) and the two were "fictitiously" married 27 September 1868.

== Importance of work ==
Kovalevsky edited many scientific books, and on 27 February 1867 he wrote to Charles Darwin about translating his latest book, The Variation of Animals and Plants Under Domestication. His translation work was so fast that the Russian copy of Variation was published several months before the "original" English version. He also translated The Descent of Man, which he and Sofia had to carry through Prussian lines into besieged Paris during the Franco-Prussian War of 1870, and The Expression of the Emotions in Man and Animals. In his lifetime, his only original work was his thesis, On the Osteology of the Hyopotamidae, in which he "documented the most famous evolutionary story of all", the transformation of a small ancestor with many toes into the large, single-toed modern horse. He also identified the primary basis for this transformation, which was a shift in their environment from eating leaves in the woodlands and marshes to grazing grass on the open plains.

== Return to Russia and suicide ==
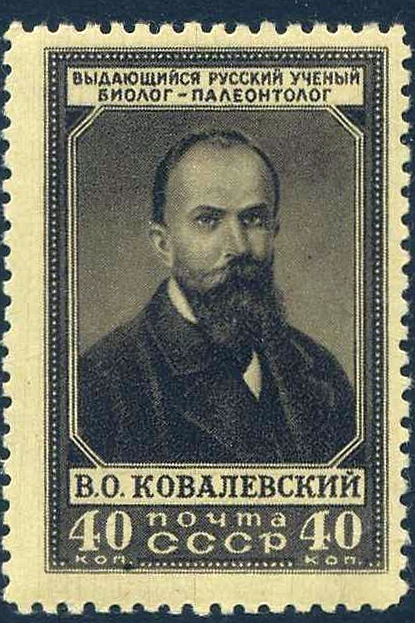
1952 Soviet Stamp of Vladimir Kovalevsky

Kovalevsky returned with his wife to Russia by 1878, with the hopes of becoming a professor of paleontology, which he was unable to attain in Europe. In October, they had a child by the name of Sofya, who they called "Foufie". However, the teaching job did not come through. Kovalevsky subsequently entered a bad business situation which led to his disgrace. Humiliated, Kovalevsky committed suicide.

== Selected works ==
- Kovalevsky, Vladimir (1873), "On the Osteology of the Hyopotamidae", Philosophical Transactions of the Royal Society of London, Series I, 163: 19, Bibcode:1873RSPT..163...19K
