= Sofya Kovalevskaya =

Russian mathematician (1850–1891)

- Софья Ковалевская
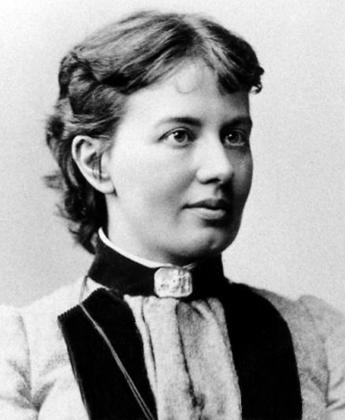
- Kovalevskaya in 1880
- Born: Sofya Vasilyevna Korvin-Krukovskaya; 15 January 1850; Moscow, Russia
- Died: 10 February 1891 (aged 41); Stockholm, Sweden
- Resting place: Norra begravningsplatsen, Solna, Sweden
- Other names: Sophie Kowalevski; Sophie Kowalevsky
- Education: University of Heidelberg; University of Göttingen (PhD)
- Known for: Kovalevskaya top Cauchy–Kowalevski theorem
- Spouse: Vladimir Kovalevsky (m. 1868; died 1883)
- Children: 1
- Awards: Prix Bordin
- Scientific career
- Fields: Mathematics
- Workplaces: Acta Mathematica; Russian Academy of Sciences; Stockholm University
- Doctoral advisor: Karl Weierstrass

Sofya Vasilyevna Kovalevskaya (Russian: Софья Васильевна Ковалевская; born Korvin-Krukovskaya; 15 January [O.S. 3 January] 1850 – 10 February 1891) was a Russian mathematician who made noteworthy contributions to analysis, partial differential equations and mechanics. She was a pioneer of equality for women in mathematics. Kovalevskaya was the first woman to earn a doctorate in mathematics, in the modern sense of that term, the first woman in Europe in modern times appointed to a full professorship in mathematics, as well as one of the first women to work for a scientific journal as an editor. According to historian of science Ann Hibner Koblitz, Kovalevskaya was "the greatest known woman scientist before the twentieth century".

Historian of mathematics Roger Cooke writes:

... the more I reflect on her life and consider the magnitude of her achievements, set against the weight of the obstacles she had to overcome, the more I admire her. For me she has taken on a heroic stature achieved by very few other people in history. To venture, as she did, into academia, a world almost no woman had yet explored, and to be consequently the object of curious scrutiny, while a doubting society looked on, half-expecting her to fail, took tremendous courage and determination. To achieve, as she did, at least two major results of lasting value to scholarship, is evidence of a considerable talent, developed through iron discipline.

There are several alternative transliterations of her name. She herself used Sophie Kowalevski (or occasionally Kowalevsky) in her academic publications. In Sweden she was known as Sonja Kovalevsky; Sonja (Russian: Соня) is her Russian nickname.

== Background and early education ==
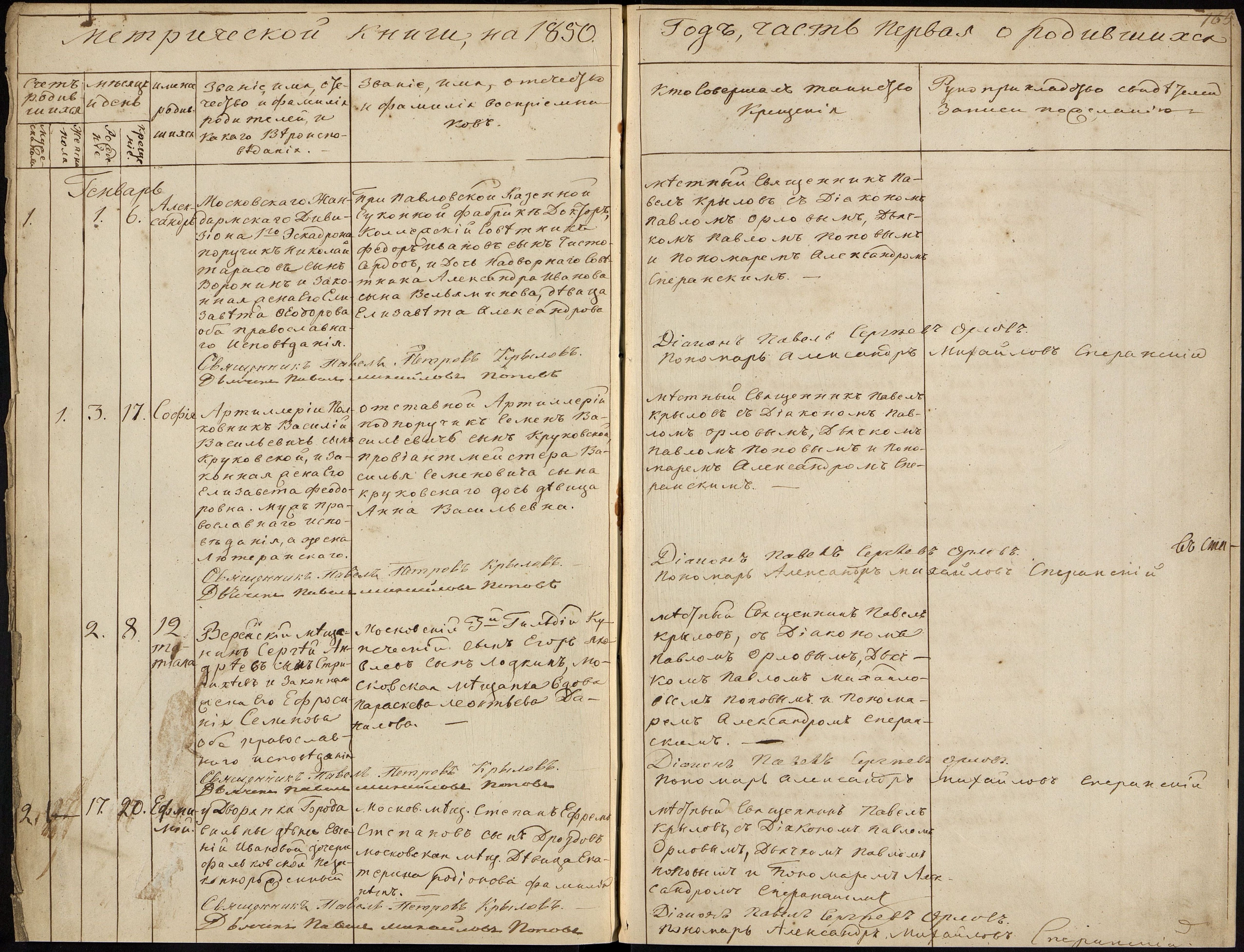
The excerpt from the 1850 birth register listing, in Russian Cyrillic, the birth of Sofia on January 3rd (Old Style date)

Sofya Kovalevskaya (née Korvin-Krukovskaya) was born in Moscow, the second of three children. Her sister was the socialist Anne Jaclard and they had a brother called Fedya. Kovalevskaya's father, Lieutenant General Vasily Vasilyevich Korvin-Krukovsky, served in the Imperial Russian Army as head of the Moscow Artillery before retiring to Polibino, his family estate in Pskov Oblast in 1858, when Kovalevskaya was eight years old. He was a member of the minor Russian nobility, of mixed Belarusian–Polish descent (Polish on his father's side), with possible partial ancestry from the royal Corvin family of Hungary, and served as Marshall of Nobility for Vitebsk province. (There may also have been some Romani ancestry on the father's side.)

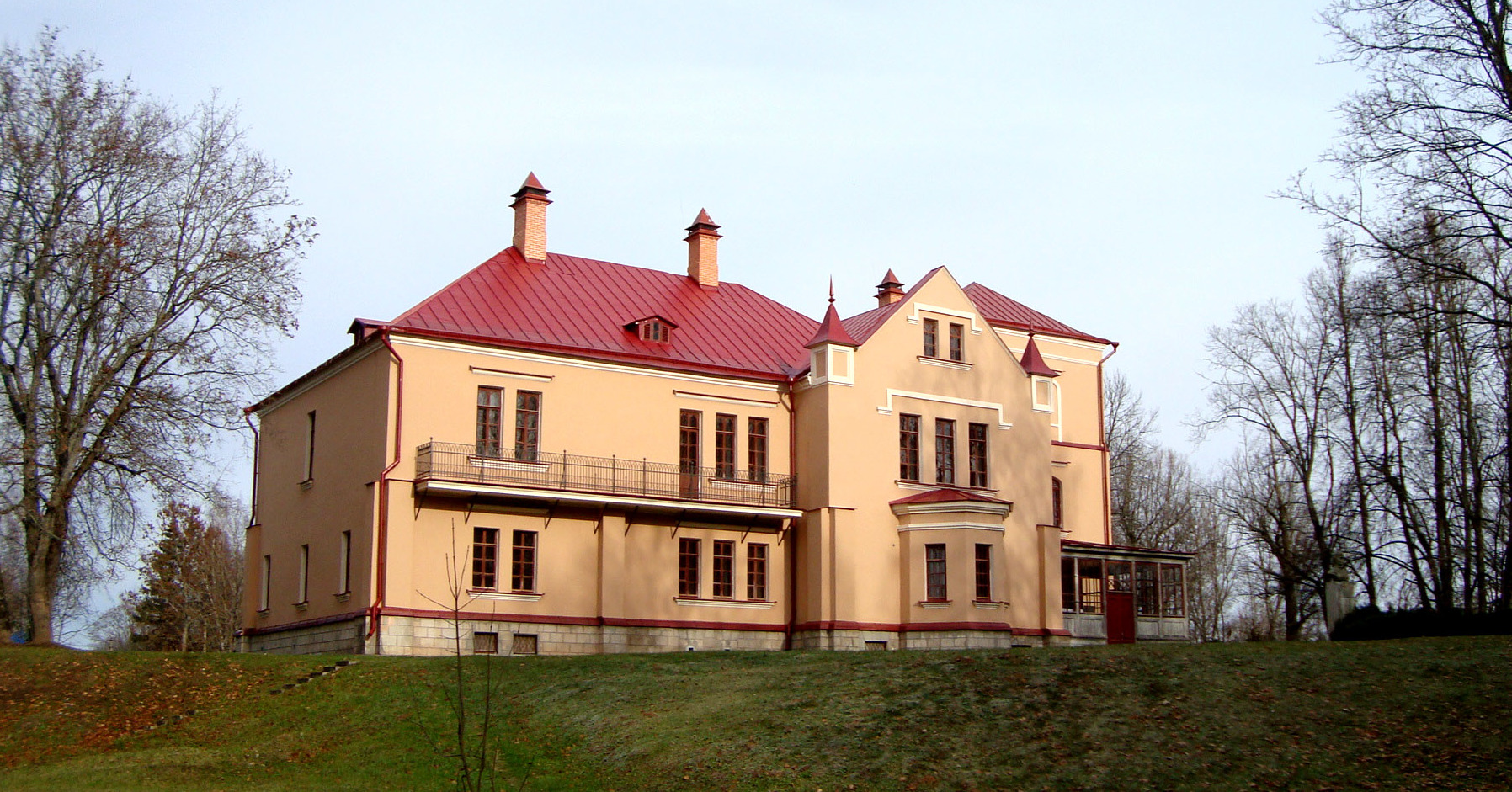
The family estate in Polibino where Kovalevskaya was raised; the building now houses a museum which exhibits her personal belongings, manuscripts and books

Her mother, Yelizaveta Fedorovna von Schubert (1820–1879), descended from a family of German immigrants to St. Petersburg who lived on Vasilievsky Island. Her maternal great-grandfather was the astronomer and geographer Friedrich Theodor von Schubert (1758–1825), who emigrated to Russia from Germany around 1785. He became a full member of the St. Petersburg Academy of Science and head of its astronomical observatory. His son, Kovalevskaya's maternal grandfather, was General Theodor Friedrich von Schubert (1789–1865), who was head of the military topographic service, and an honorary member of the Russian Academy of Sciences, as well as Director of the Kunstkamera museum.

Kovalevskaya's parents provided her with a good early education. At various times, her governesses were native speakers of English, French, and German. When she was 11 years old, she was intrigued by a foretaste of what she was to learn later in her lessons in calculus; the wall of her room had been papered with pages from lecture notes by Mikhail Ostrogradsky on differential and integral calculus, left over from her father's student days, as not enough wallpaper had been ordered to cover the walls of all of the children's rooms. She was tutored privately in elementary mathematics by Iosif Ignatevich Malevich.

The physicist Nikolai Nikanorovich Tyrtov noted Kovalevskaya's unusual aptitude when she managed to understand his textbook by discovering for herself an approximate construction of trigonometric functions which she had not yet encountered in her studies. Tyrtov called her a "new Pascal" and suggested she be given a chance to pursue further studies under the tutelage of Aleksandr Nikolayevich Strannolyubsky. In 1866–67 she spent much of the winter with her family in St. Petersburg, where she was provided private tutoring by Strannoliubskii, a well-known advocate of higher education for women, who taught her calculus. During that same period, the son of a local priest introduced her sister Anna to progressive ideas influenced by the radical movement of the 1860s, providing her with copies of radical journals of the time discussing Russian nihilism.

Although the word nihilist (нигилист) often was used in a negative sense, it did not have that meaning for the young Russians of the 1860s (шестидесятники):

After the famous writer Ivan Turgenev used the word nihilist to refer to Bazarov, the young hero of his 1862 novel Fathers and Children, a certain segment of the "new people" adopted that name as well, despite its negative connotations in most quarters.... For the nihilists, science appeared to be the most effective means of helping the mass of people to a better life. Science pushed back the barriers of religion and superstition, and "proved" through the theory of evolution that (peaceful) social revolutions were the way of nature. For the early nihilists, science was virtually synonymous with truth, progress and radicalism; thus, the pursuit of a scientific career was viewed in no way as a hindrance to social activism. In fact, it was seen as a positive boost to progressive forces, an active blow against backwardness.

Despite her obvious talent for mathematics, Kovalevskaya could not complete her education in Russia. At that time, women were not allowed to attend universities in Russia and most other countries. In order to study abroad, Kovalevskaya needed written permission from her father (or husband). According to Kovalevskaya's close friend Elizaveta Litvinova, Kovalevskaya could have convinced her father to let her go abroad for advanced study, but preferred a fictitious marriage because it was more dramatic and was fashionable among the radicals of her generation. In 1868 she contracted a "fictitious marriage" with Vladimir Kovalevsky, a young palaeontology student, book publisher and radical, who was the first to translate and publish the works of Charles Darwin in Russia. They moved from Russia to Germany in 1869, after a brief stay in Vienna, in order to pursue advanced studies.

== Student years ==
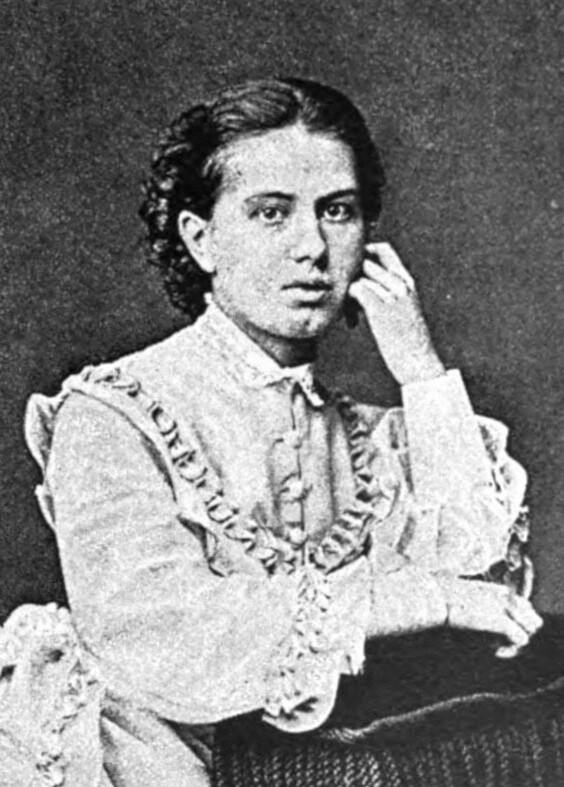
Kovalevskaya at 18 years

In April 1869, following Sofia's and Vladimir's brief stay in Vienna, where she attended lectures in physics at the university, they moved to Heidelberg. Through great efforts, she obtained permission to audit classes with the professors' approval at the University of Heidelberg. There she attended courses in physics and mathematics under such teachers as Hermann von Helmholtz, Gustav Kirchhoff and Robert Bunsen. Vladimir, meanwhile, went on to the University of Jena to pursue a doctorate in palaeontology.

In October 1869, shortly after attending courses in Heidelberg, she visited London with Vladimir, who spent time with his colleagues Thomas Huxley and Charles Darwin, while she was invited to attend George Eliot's Sunday salons. There, at age nineteen, she met Herbert Spencer and was led into a debate, at Eliot's instigation, on "woman's capacity for abstract thought". Although there is no record of the details of their conversation, she had just completed a lecture course in Heidelberg on mechanics, and she may just possibly have made mention of the Euler equations governing the motion of a rigid body (see following section). Eliot was writing Middlemarch at the time, in which one finds the remarkable sentence: "In short, woman was a problem which, since Mr. Brooke's mind felt blank before it, could hardly be less complicated than the revolutions of an irregular solid." This was well before Kovalevskaya's notable contribution of the "Kovalevskaya top" to the brief list of known examples of integrable rigid body motion (see following section).

In October 1870, Kovalevskaya moved to Berlin, where she began to take private lessons with Karl Weierstrass, since the university would not allow her even to audit classes. He was very impressed with her mathematical skills, and over the subsequent three years taught her the same material that comprised his lectures at the university. While studying under Weierstrass, Kovalevskaya lived with her friend Julia Lermontova, who became the first Russian woman to earn a doctorate in chemistry. Kovalevskaya referred to Vladimir as a brother and their marriage had not been consummated.

In 1871 Kovalevskaya briefly travelled to Paris together with Vladimir in order to help in the Paris Commune, where Kovalevskaya attended the injured and her sister Anyuta was active in the Commune. With the fall of the Commune, however, both Anyuta and her common law husband Victor Jaclard, who was leader of the Montmartre contingent of the National Guard and a prominent Blanquiste, were arrested. Although Anyuta managed to escape to London, Jaclard was sentenced to execution. However, with the assistance of Sofia's and Anyuta's father General Krukovsky, who had come urgently to Paris to help Anyuta and who wrote to Adolphe Thiers asking for clemency, Jaclard was saved.

Kovalevskaya returned to Berlin and continued her studies with Weierstrass for three more years. In 1874 she presented three papers—on partial differential equations, on the dynamics of Saturn's rings, and on elliptic integrals—to the University of Göttingen as her doctoral dissertation. With the support of Weierstrass, this earned her a doctorate in mathematics summa cum laude, after Weierstrass succeeded in having her exempted from the usual oral examinations.

Kovalevskaya was the first woman to have been awarded a doctorate (in the modern sense of the word) in mathematics, which occurred in 1874. Her paper on partial differential equations contains what is now commonly known as the Cauchy–Kovalevskaya theorem, which proves the existence and analyticity of local solutions to such equations under suitably defined initial/boundary conditions.

== Last years in Germany and Sweden ==
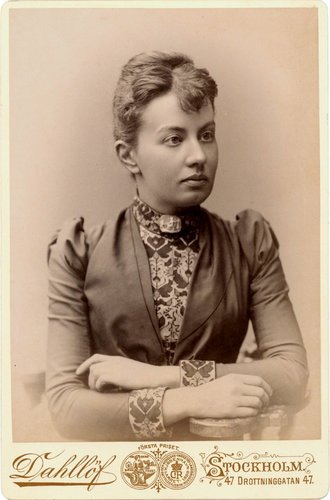
Kovalevskaya in 1880

In 1874, Kovalevskaya and her husband Vladimir returned to Russia, but Vladimir failed to secure a professorship because of his radical beliefs (Kovalevskaya never would have been considered for such a position because of her gender.) During this time they tried a variety of schemes to support themselves, including real estate development and involvement with an oil company. But in the late 1870s they faced serious financial problems, leading to bankruptcy.

In 1875, for some unknown reason, perhaps the death of her father, Sofia and Vladimir decided to spend several years together as an actual married couple. Three years later their daughter, Sofia (called "Fufa"), was born. After almost two years devoted to raising her daughter, Kovalevskaya put Fufa under the care of relatives and friends in Russia, resumed her work in mathematics, and left Vladimir for what would be the last time. Vladimir, who had always suffered severe mood swings, became more unstable. In 1883, faced with worsening mood swings and the possibility of being prosecuted for his role in a stock swindle, Vladimir died by suicide.

In 1881, Kovalevskaya was elected as a member of the Moscow Mathematical Society (MMS).

In 1883, with the help of the Swedish mathematician Gösta Mittag-Leffler, whom she had known as a fellow student of Weierstrass, Kovalevskaya was able to secure a position as a privat-docent at Stockholm University in Sweden. Kovalevskaya met Mittag-Leffler's sister, the actress, novelist, and playwright Anne Charlotte Edgren-Leffler. Until Kovalevskaya's death the two women shared a close friendship.

In 1884 Kovalevskaya was appointed to a five-year position as Extraordinary Professor (assistant professor in modern terminology) and became an editor of the journal Acta Mathematica. In 1888 she won the Prix Bordin of the French Academy of Science, for her work "Mémoire sur un cas particulier du problème de la rotation d'un corps pesant autour d'un point fixe, où l'intégration s'effectue à l'aide des fonctions ultraelliptiques du temps". Her submission featured her celebrated discovery of what is now known as the "Kovalevskaya top", which was subsequently shown to be the only other case of rigid body motion that is "completely integrable" other than the tops of Euler and Lagrange.

In 1889 Kovalevskaya was appointed Ordinary Professor (full professor) in mathematics at Stockholm University, the first woman in Europe in modern times to hold such a position. After much lobbying on her behalf (and a change in the academy's rules) she was made a Corresponding Member of the Russian Academy of Sciences, but she was never offered a professorship in Russia.

Kovalevskaya, who was involved in the progressive political and feminist currents of late nineteenth-century Russian nihilism, wrote several non-mathematical works as well, including a memoir, A Russian Childhood, two plays (in collaboration with her friend Duchess Edgren-Leffler) and a partly autobiographical novel, Nihilist Girl (1890). As of 2022, her personal writings have not been translated in their entirety.

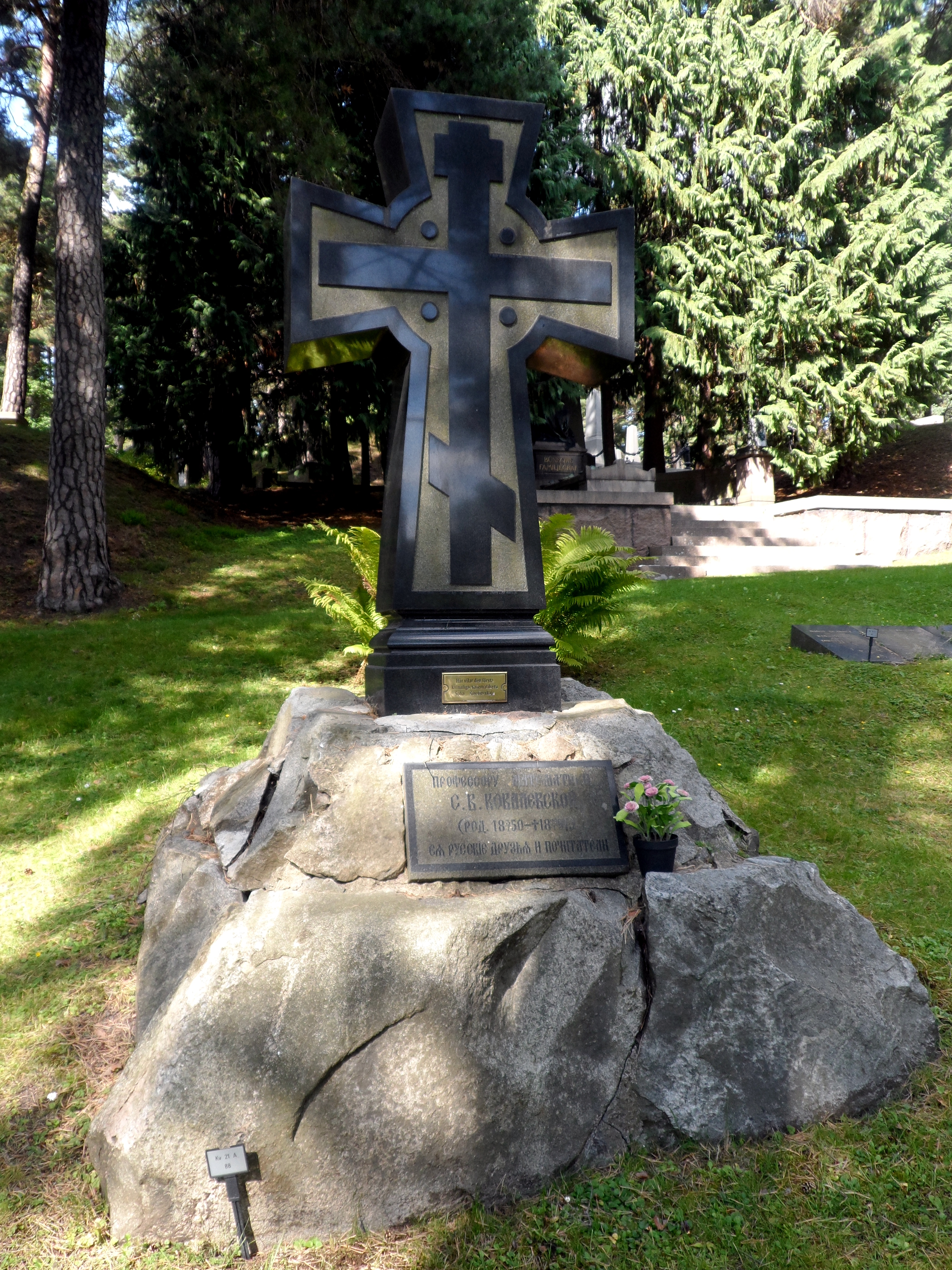
Kovalevskaya's grave, Norra begravningsplatsen

In 1889, Kovalevskaya fell in love with Russian jurist Maxim Kovalevsky, a distant relation of her deceased husband, but insisted on not marrying him because she would not be able to settle down and live with him.

Kovalevskaya died of flu complicated by pneumonia in 1891, aged forty-one, after returning from a vacation in Nice with Maxim. She is buried in Solna, Sweden, at Norra begravningsplatsen.

Kovalevskaya's mathematical results, such as the Cauchy–Kowalevski theorem, and her pioneering role as a female mathematician in an almost exclusively male-dominated field, have made her the subject of several books, including a biography by Ann Hibner Koblitz, a biography in Russian by Polubarinova-Kochina (translated into English by M. Burov with the title Love and Mathematics: Sofya Kovalevskaya, Mir Publishers, 1985), a book titled Remembering Sofya Kovalevskaya by French mathematician Michèle Audin, and a book about her mathematics by Roger Cooke.

== Tributes ==
The asteroid 1859 Kovalevskaya is named in her honor. The official naming citation was published by the Minor Planet Center on 1 June 1975 (M.P.C. 3826).

In 1985 Ann Hibner Koblitz and her husband Neal established the Kovalevskaia Fund; a non-profit organization whose purpose is to support and encourage women in developing countries in science, mathematics, engineering, and medicine. It was originally aimed at promoting women in the sciences in Vietnam; it grew out of Ann's work on the history of women and science, her and Neal's experience in the opposition to United States involvement in the Vietnam War, and their efforts to help promote science in Vietnam afterwards.

The Kovalevskaya Prize (Russian: Премия имени С. В. Ковалевской) is a national scientific prize awarded by the Russian Academy of Sciences for outstanding achievements in mathematics, since 1997.

The Alexander von Humboldt Foundation of Germany bestowed the Sofia Kovalevskaya Award from 2002 to 2020. The foundation encouraged applications from all areas of learning so long as the applicant had received a Ph.D. in the previous six years and could be categorized as "top flight" by their publications and experience as commensurate with age.

The AWM-SIAM Sonia Kovalevsky Lecture is an award and lecture series that "highlights the achievements of women in applied and computational mathematics." The Association for Women in Mathematics (AWM) and the Society for Industrial and Applied Mathematics (SIAM) planned the award and lecture series in 2002 and first awarded it in 2003. The lecture is normally given each year at the SIAM Annual Meeting.

On 30 June 2021, a satellite named after her (also called ÑuSat 22) was launched.

On January 15, 2025, a postage stamp honoring her 175th birthday was put into circulation in Russia. The stamp features a portrait of her, a Kovalevskaya top, and “formulae illustrating the study of the rotation of a heavy asymmetric body around a fixed point.”

The lunar crater Kovalevskaya is named in her honor.

There is a Sofia Kovalevskaya Award given by the Cuban Society of Mathematics and Computer Science for “the original and creative use of these subjects to solve problems in society.” It is sponsored by the Kovalevskaya Foundation.

A school in Vilnius, Lithuania, is named after her, called Sofija Kovalevskaja Gymnasium. There was another school in Vilnius named after her, called Sofija Kovalevskaja Progymnasium, but in 2024 its name was changed to Vilnius "Sostinės" gymnasium.

Sofya Kovalevsky High School Mathematics Day is a grant-making program of the Association for Women in Mathematics (AWM), funding workshops across the United States which encourage girls to explore mathematics. While the AWM currently does not have grant money to support this program, multiple universities continue the program with their own funding.

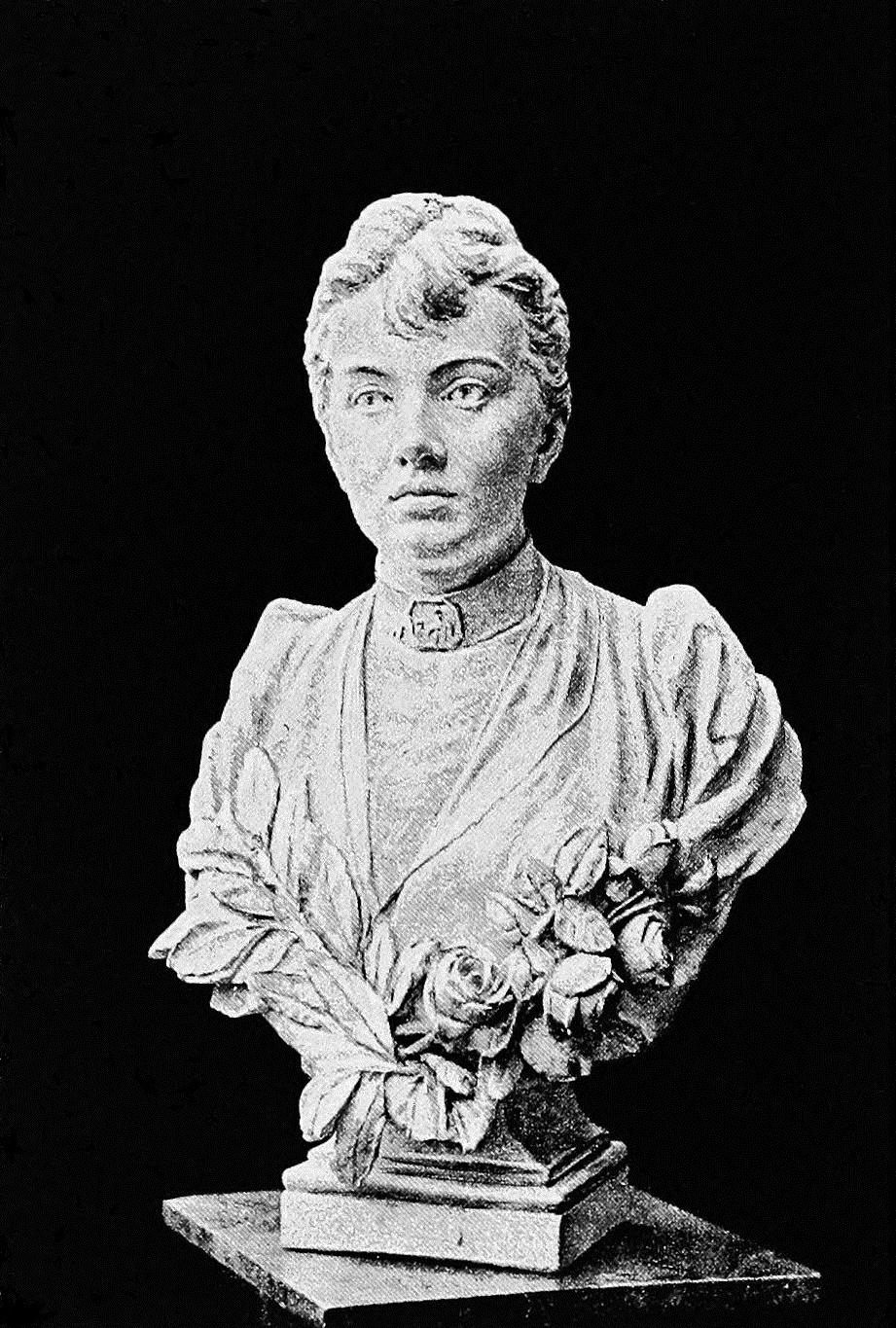
Bust by Finnish sculptor Walter Runeberg

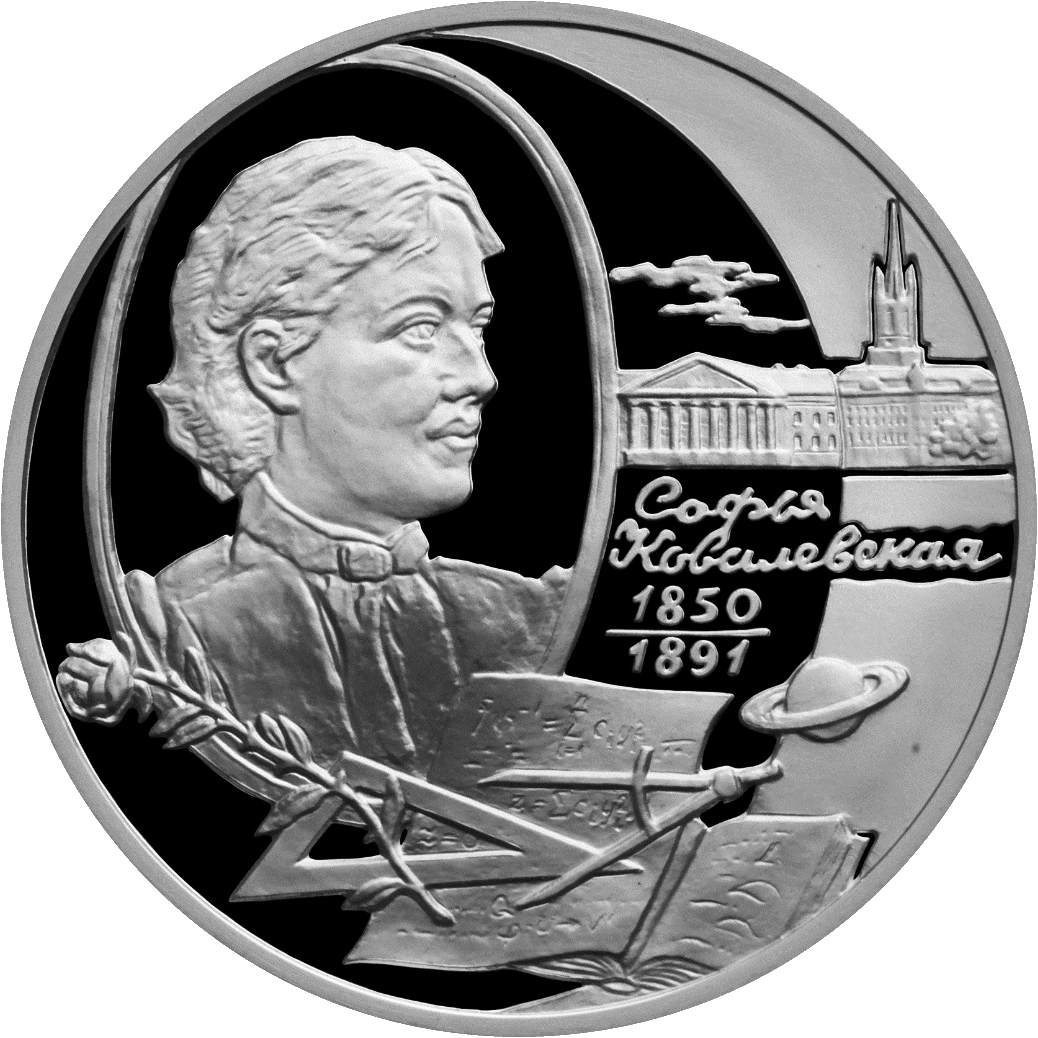
Commemorative coin, 2000

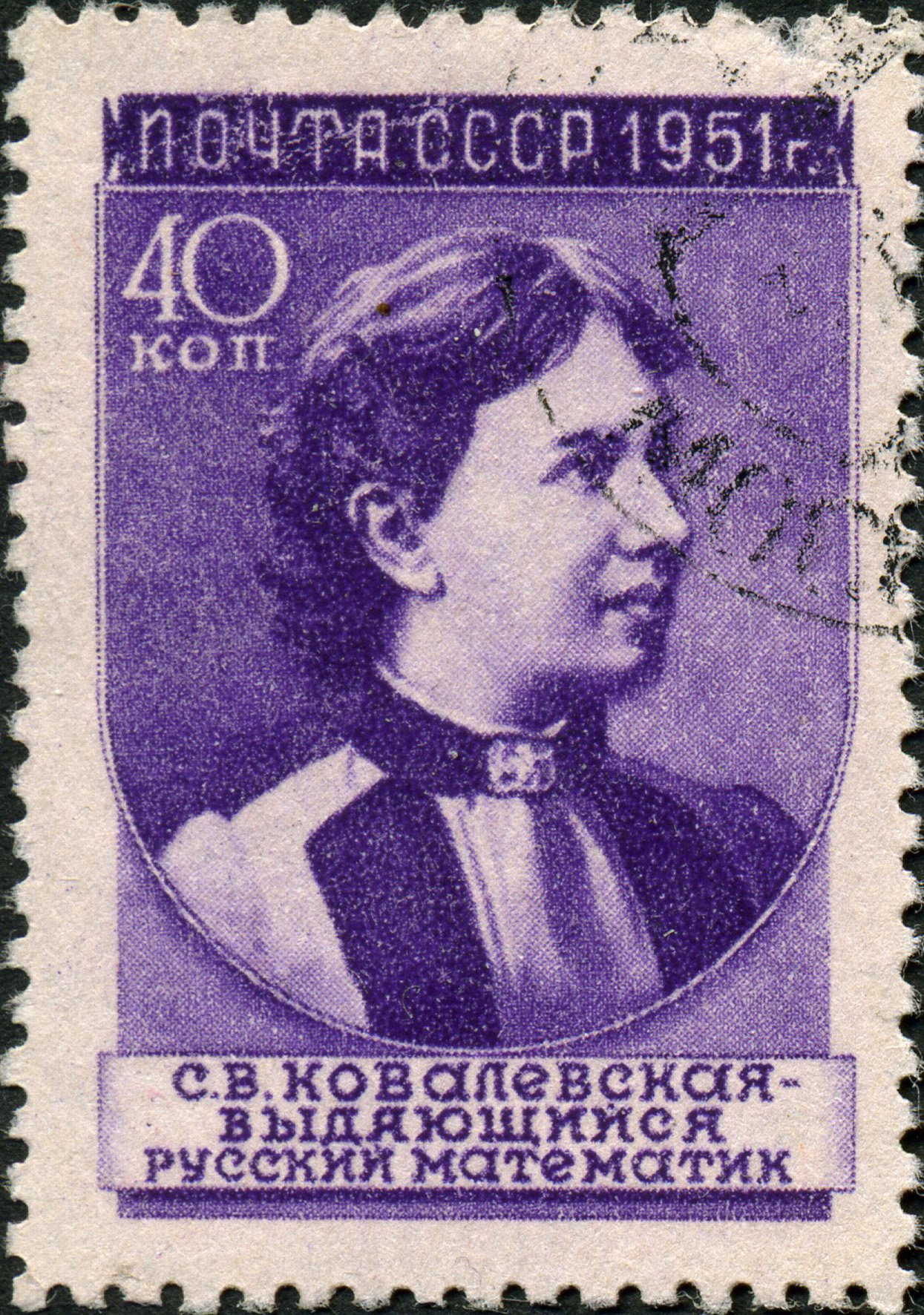
Soviet Union postage stamp, 1951

== In film ==
Kovalevskaya has been the subject of three film and TV biographies.

- Sofya Kovalevskaya (1956) directed by Iosef Shapiro, starring Yelena Yunger, Lev Kolesov and Tatyana Sezenyevskaya.
- Berget på månens baksida ("A Hill on the Dark Side of the Moon") (1983) directed by Lennart Hjulström, starring Gunilla Nyroos as Sofja Kovalewsky and Bibi Andersson as Anne Charlotte Edgren-Leffler, Duchess of Cajanello, and sister to Gösta Mittag-Leffler.
- Sofya Kovalevskaya (1985 TV) directed by Azerbaijani director Ayan Shakhmaliyeva, starring Yelena Safonova as Sofia.

== In literature ==
- Little Sparrow: A Portrait of Sophia Kovalevsky (1983), Don H. Kennedy, Ohio University Press, Athens, Ohio ISBN 0821406922 LCCN 82-12405
- Beyond the Limit: The Dream of Sofya Kovalevskaya (2002), ISBN 0765302330 LCCN 2002-24363, a biographical novel by mathematician and educator Joan Spicci, published by Tom Doherty Associates
- Against the Day, a 2006 novel by Thomas Pynchon, was speculated before release to be based on the life of Kovalevskaya, but in the finished novel she appears as a minor character.
- "Too Much Happiness" (2009), a short story by Alice Munro, published in the August 2009 issue of Harper's Magazine, features Kovalevskaya as a main character. It was later published in a collection of the same name.
- Poet Jessy Randall's 2022 collection Mathematics for Ladies includes a poem honoring Kovalevskaya.

== See also ==
- Cauchy–Kowalevski theorem
- Kowalevski top
- Timeline of women in science
- Timeline of women in mathematics

== Selected publications ==
- Kowalevski, Sophie (1875), "Zur Theorie der partiellen Differentialgleichung", Journal für die reine und angewandte Mathematik, 80: 1–32 (The surname given in the paper is "von Kowalevsky".)
- Kowalevski, Sophie (1884), "Über die Reduction einer bestimmten Klasse Abel'scher Integrale 3ten Ranges auf elliptische Integrale" (PDF), Acta Mathematica, 4 (1): 393–414, doi:10.1007/BF02418424
- Kowalevski, Sophie (1885), "Über die Brechung des Lichtes In Cristallinischen Mitteln" (PDF), Acta Mathematica, 6 (1): 249–304, doi:10.1007/BF02400418
- Kowalevski, Sophie (1889), "Sur le probleme de la rotation d'un corps solide autour d'un point fixe" (PDF), Acta Mathematica, 12 (1): 177–232, doi:10.1007/BF02592182
- Kowalevski, Sophie (1890), "Sur une propriété du système d'équations différentielles qui définit la rotation d'un corps solide autour d'un point fixe", Acta Mathematica, 14 (1): 81–93, doi:10.1007/BF02413316
- Kowalevski, Sophie (1891), "Sur un théorème de M. Bruns", Acta Mathematica, 15 (1): 45–52, doi:10.1007/BF02392602, S2CID 124051110
- Kovalevskaya, Sofia (2021). Mathematician with the Soul of a Poet: Poems and Plays of Sofia Kovalevskaya. Translated by Coleman, Sandra DeLozier. Bohannon Hall Press. ISBN 979-8985029802.

== Novel ==
- Nihilist Girl, translated by Natasha Kolchevska with Mary Zirin; introduction by Natasha Kolchevska. Modern Language Association of America (2001) ISBN 0-87352-790-9
