= Weyl (crater) =

Crater on the Moon

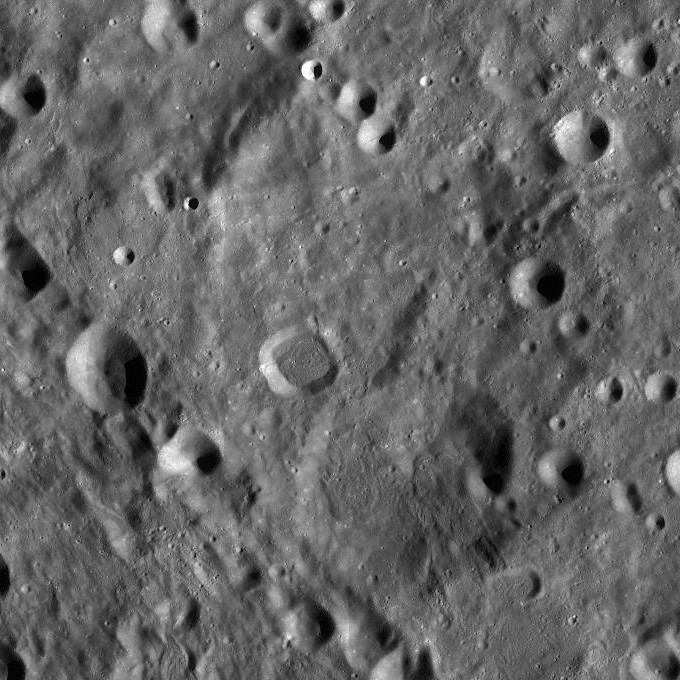
- LRO WAC image
- Coordinates: 17.5°N 120.2°W
- Diameter: 108 km (67 mi)
- Depth: Unknown
- Colongitude: 122° at sunrise
- Eponym: Hermann Weyl

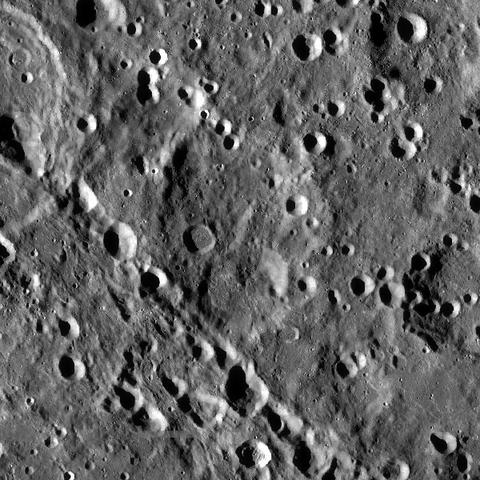
Weyl at center, Fersman at left border, crater chains from Orientale impact below

Weyl is a lunar impact crater that is located on the far side of the Moon, behind the western limb as seen from the Earth. It lies to the east-southeast of the larger crater Fersman. To the southeast is Kamerlingh Onnes, and to the northeast is Shternberg.

This is a heavily eroded crater with a damaged outer rim. There are multiple craters along the rim and within the interior, including a pair of small craters in the western half. Most of Weyl is overlain by a portion of the ray system from the crater Ohm to the east-southeast of Shternberg.
