= Free Radicals (short story) =

- Short story by Alice Munro
- Country: United States
- Language: English
- Genres: Horror fiction Short story, Gothic Literature

Publication
- Published in: 2009
- Publisher: Alfred A. Knopf New Yorker
- Media type: Print

"Free Radicals" is a 2008 short story by Alice Munro. It was published in the collection Too Much Happiness.

== Publication history ==
"Free Radicals" was first published in The New Yorker in 2008. In 2009, it was included in the collection Too Much Happiness, published by Douglas Gibson Books.

== Plot ==
"Free Radicals" is the story of a recently widowed woman named Nita. Her husband, Rich, had just died while on his way to the hardware store. Rich's death came as a surprise to Nita. She had been diagnosed with cancer a year before, and they were expecting her to die before him, especially because Rich had just been given a good bill of health the week before his death. Nita and her husband had planned only the humblest of funerals. She had buried him and had since been secluding herself in her house. Rich had been married once before to a woman named Bett. Nita had been Rich's mistress. Bett and Richard eventually divorced, and Rich married Nita. When Rich and Bett divorced, Rich got the house where Rich and Nita lived until his death. After his death, Nita took it upon herself to go through and tidy the house. One morning there was a knock at the door. A man claimed to be there to check out her fuse box. When he was finished, he feigned being ill from his diabetes. He asked Nita if she could fix him something to eat. The situation quickly soured. The man forced Nita to listen to his story. The story of how he killed his family. The man had been under the impression that his parents were going to give him their house. He then found out that the deal stipulated that he was to take care of his sister, whom he disdained. When he found out the stipulation to the deal, he hatched a plan and killed his family. When the man finished the story, Nita was certain that her knowledge of what the man had done would be the end of her. She then decided to tell a story of her own. She fabricated a story where she was not Nita, and in fact, she was Bett. She told the man that she had baked a poison tart for "Nita" and fed it to her. She told the man that "Nita" had died and that it had saved her marriage. Nita told the man this story to empathize with his situation. If they had both performed murderous acts, they both had an understanding of each other, and maybe he would not kill her for her knowledge of his wrongdoings. After Nita told the man her story, he became upset and wanted to leave. He took Nita's late husband's car and fled. The next morning Nita was awakened by a police officer who told her that the man who had taken the car was in an accident and killed instantly.

== Analysis ==
Analyzing the story of "Free Radicals," there is a connection between reality and the world Alice Munro creates. Cindy Daniel's article, she explores the works of Munro and how they blend reality with fiction. She states, "Munro uses this technique with deliberate force to explore the worlds she creates more completely. She doesn't, of course, write ‘the facts and nothing but the facts’ in her stories, but instead allows her own lived reality to blend with the fictional reality she puts on the page."

In an article titled "Structure and Serendipity," Patricia Demers argues that without Nita's letter to Bett, the reader would not have known that Nita was pretending to be Bett. "Dear Bett. Rich is dead, and I have saved my life by becoming you" (Munro 143). Instead, we would see that Nita killed someone to keep her relationship intact. She says that "the intricate structure of the story restores the balance so that the reader is relieved to learn that the central character is really Nita" (Demers 20).

Ulrica Skagert's dissertation puts forth an argument that the smallest event in one's life can change the very outcome of one's being and sometimes alter one's destiny. There are examples of this in our story, such as the buying of the summer home. At the time, it was not known that this could happen, but it still set off a chain of events that brought about the story.

== Film adaptation ==
On February 9, 2021, it was announced that Miramax had optioned Munro's short story. Xia Magnus and Alyssa Polk, reteaming after the 2020 independent film Sanzaru, were attached to adapt the story, with Magnus also attached to direct. It was also announced that Jon Shestack would produce the film.

== Works cited ==
- Too Much Hppiness: Stories / Alice Munro. Publication Information: New York : Alfred A. Knopf, 2009.
- Possibility-Space and Its Imaginative Variations in Alice Munro's Short Stories, By: Skagert, Ulrica
- Daniels, Cindy Lou (2006). "Creating fictionality: Re-living reality in Alice Munro's fiction". Eureka Studies in Teaching Short Fiction. 6 (2): 94–105.
- Structure and Serendipity: Patricia Demers, University of Alberta
