= Free Radical Centre =

- ARC Centre of Excellence for Free Radical Chemistry and Biotechnology
- Established: 2005
- Research type: Research centre
- Location: Melbourne; Sydney; Brisbane and Canberra; 33°52′31″S 151°08′00″E
- Campus: University of Melbourne, Victoria
- Affiliations: University of Melbourne; Monash University; University of Sydney; Queensland University of Technology; University of Wollongong; Australian National University
- Website: freeradical.org.au

The Free Radical Centre or ARC Centre of Excellence for Free Radical Chemistry and Biotechnology was a research centre from 2005 - 2013 that was established in the 2005 Australian Research Council (ARC) grant funding rounds. The centre was administered from the University of Melbourne, and had nodes at six Australian universities: The University of Melbourne, the Victorian Pharmacy College at Monash University, The Heart Research Institute at the University of Sydney, Queensland University of Technology, the University of Wollongong, and the Australian National University in Canberra. The Centre had over 100 researchers working in all areas of free radical chemistry, from material science to biology. The centre received an initial grant of $12 million from the ARC in 2005 and a further $9.8 million in 2009. Funding for the centre ended in 2013.
