= Fersman (crater) =

Lunar impact crater

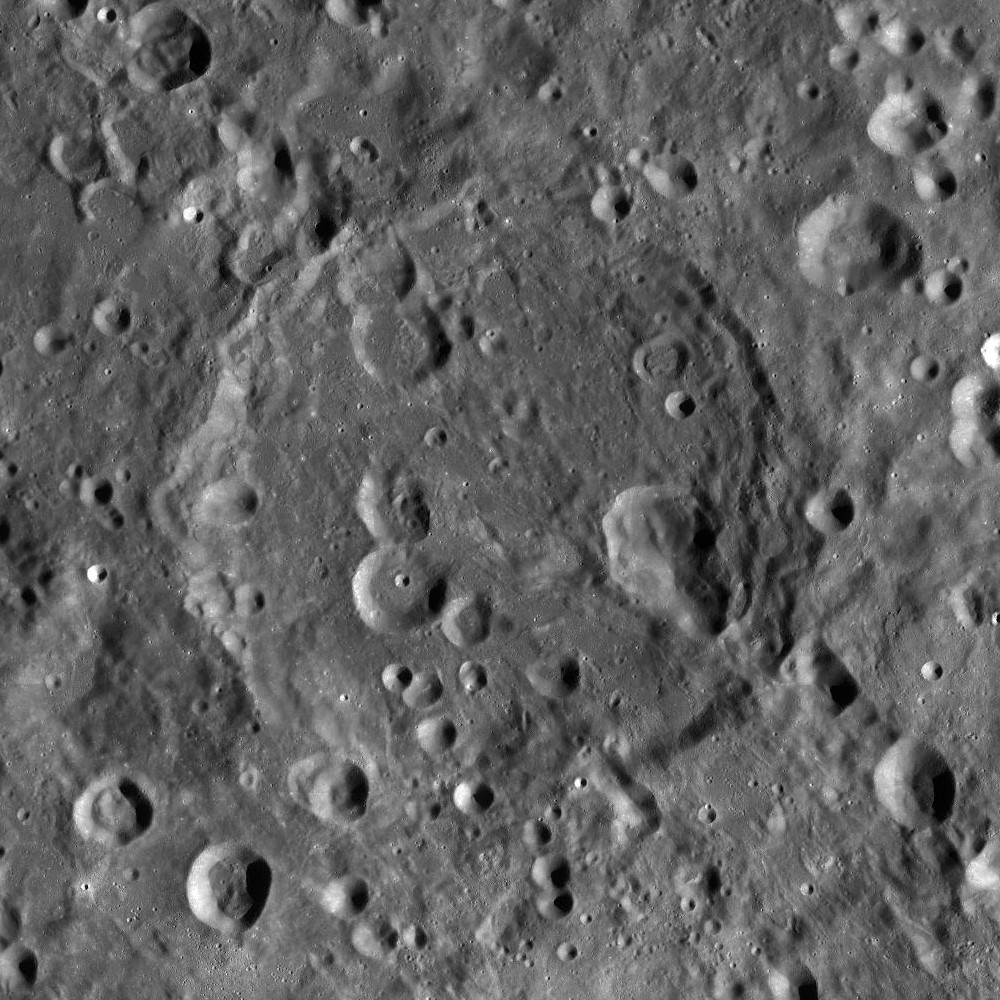
- LRO WAC mosaic
- Coordinates: 18.7°N 126.0°W
- Diameter: 148.14 km (92.05 mi)
- Depth: Unknown
- Colongitude: 128° at sunrise
- Formation: Nectarian or Eratosthenian
- Eponym: Aleksandr Fersman

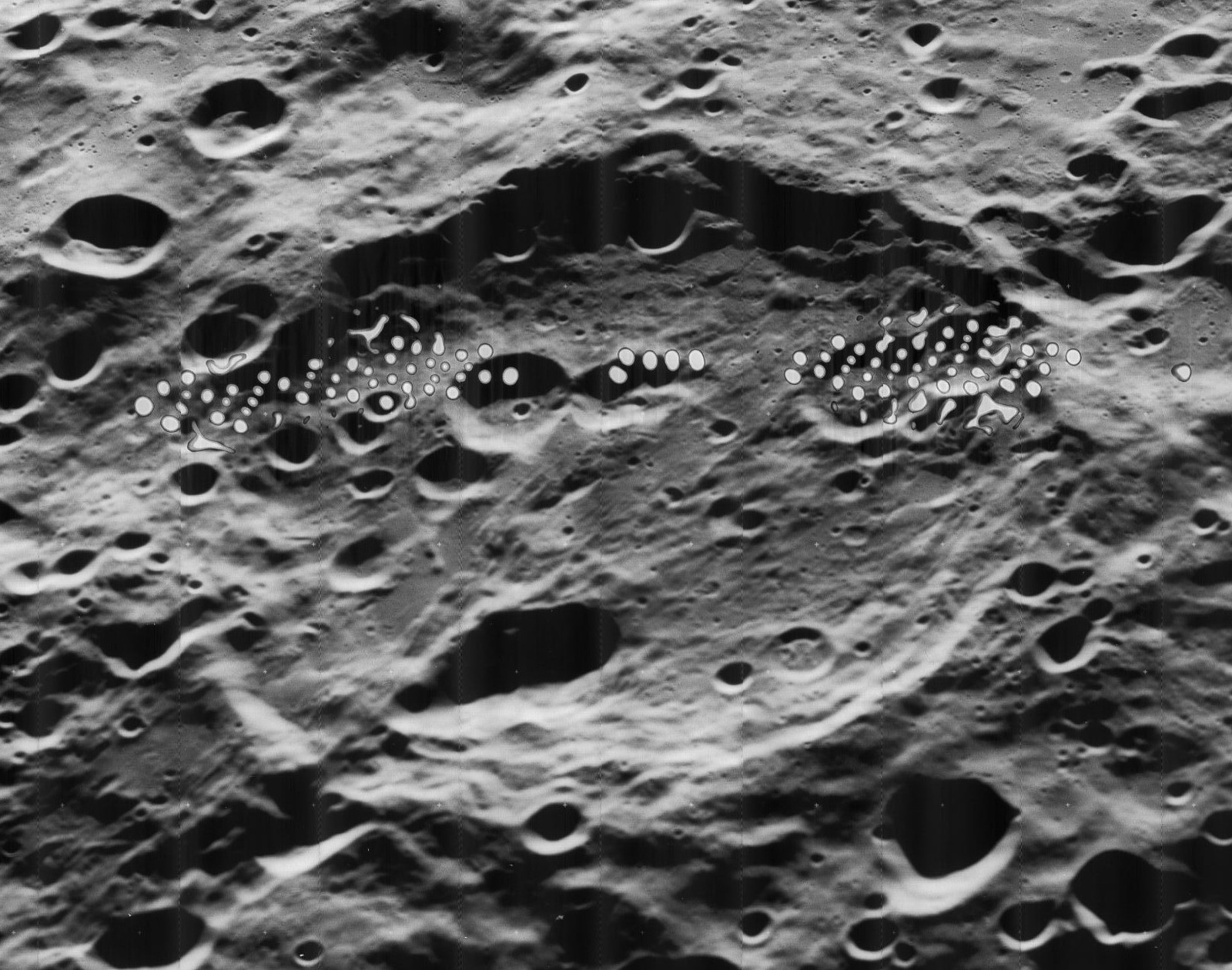
Oblique Lunar Orbiter 5 image. Band of dots are blemishes on original.

Fersman is a large lunar impact crater on the Moon's far side. It lies to the east of the crater Poynting, and west-northwest of Weyl. To the south is a huge walled plain called Hertzsprung.

This is a worn crater with a low, outer rim that dates to the Nectarian or possibly the Eratosthenian period of the lunar geologic timescale. The dating is uncertain due to overlaying ejecta from the formation of the Hertzsprung and Orientale impact basins. The southeast rim and the eastern Fersman interior floor are marked by ejecta deposits that trend from southeast to northwest. Several small craters lie across the interior floor, including a grouping to the south of the midpoint. The rim has an outward bulge along the southeast side and irregular edges to the north and south. A small crater lies along the western inner wall.

There is a nearly linear series of small craters that begin to the southeast of the crater, and continue about 100 km to the northwest of the crater. There is a break in this chain across the middle of the crater's interior floor, then it continues again near the northern rim.

During the crewed mission of Artemis II in April 2026, Fersman and its surroundings was seen for the first time by human eyes.

This formation is named after Soviet geochemist Aleksandr Fersman (1883-1945). Its designation was formally adopted by the International Astronomical Union in 1970.
