= Polibino, Velikoluksky District, Pskov Oblast =

Rural locality in Velikoluksky District, Pskov Oblast, Russia

Coordinates: 56°08′04″N 30°23′53″E

Polibino (Russian: Полибино) is a rural locality (a selo) in Velikoluksky District of Pskov Oblast, Russia.

== Korwin-Krukovskie Estate ==
The Korwin-Krukovskie Estate is located in Polibino.
