= Vārkava Parish =

Parish of Latvia

- parish of Latvia
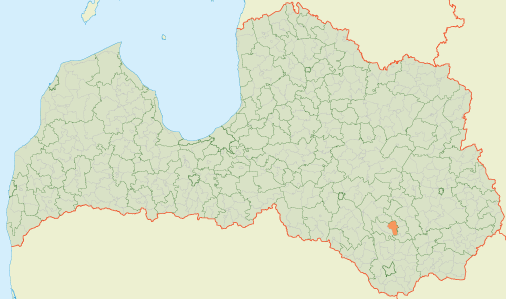
- 56°13′57″N 26°37′15″E
- Country: Latvia

Area
  - Total: 78.68 km^{2} (30.38 sq mi)
  - Land: 77.15 km^{2} (29.79 sq mi)
  - Water: 1.53 km^{2} (0.59 sq mi)

Population (1 January 2025)
  - Total: 488
  - Density: 6.33/km^{2} (16.4/sq mi)

Vārkava Parish (Latvian: Vārkavas pagasts) is an administrative unit of Preiļi Municipality in the Latgale region of Latvia.

== Towns, villages and settlements of Vārkava Parish ==
The central village in the parish is Vārkava. The village, parish, and surrounding municipality are also called Vorkova in the Latgalian language.
