= Ella sigue de viaje =

Ella Sigue de Viaje
- Author: Luis Felipe Lomelí
- Language: Spanish
- Publication date: March 2005
- Publication place: Mexico
- Media type: Print

Ella sigue de viaje (She travels on) is the second book published by Mexican writer Luis Felipe Lomelí, published in 2005. It is best known for the opening short story named El emigrante (The Emigrant), a flash fiction story which consist only of the four words "¿Olvida usted algo? -¡Ojalá! " ("Forget something? -If only!").

== Themes ==
The book opens with El emigrante, one of the most celebrated and frequently cited of microfictions. It is considered the shortest story in the Spanish language. The story may be seen as a summary of the feelings of the characters in the other twelve stories in the book, whether they have left behind love, loneliness or violence. The subject matter of these stories range from romantic love encounters to adultery, with lovers looking to expand their sexuality in random encounters, to relationships with hopelessness and violence, such as a police officer brutally beating his wife after suppressing a demonstration against the military dictatorship of Chile, a mother who abuses her son etc. The stories are set in a range of places from New York City to Valparaíso. One of the most important themes of the book is that violent society overshadows our love lives.

== Reception ==
The book was well received. In addition to the interest aroused by El emigrante, the story El cielo de Neuquén (The Neuquén Sky) won the Edmundo Valadés Latin American Short Story Prize. Apart from the recognition, the Edmundo Valadés award is worth $50,000 and a trip to the city of Puebla. The book won the prestigious San Luis Potosí national short story award. El Emigrante inspired the installation work ¿Olvida usted algo? – ¡Ojalá! by artist Susana Rodríguez, which explores the dialectic between construction and destruction as an event that helps us understand and accept the transformation of life as inevitable. Discussing the title, the artist observed that the four words in Lomelí's story generate many ideas, including ones on subjects you would not normally think about. The story is a perfect title for the project, since one of the most important factors in evolution is learning, which is based on memory.

== Bibliography ==
- Lomelí, Luis Felipe (2005). Ella Sigue de Viaje. México: Tusquets Editores. ISBN 970-699-105-0.
