= Conte cruel =

Short-story genre

The conte cruel (French for "cruel tale") is, as The A to Z of Fantasy Literature by Brian Stableford states, a "short-story genre that takes its name from an 1883 collection by Villiers de l'Isle-Adam, although previous examples had been provided by such writers as Edgar Allan Poe. Some critics use the label to refer only to non-supernatural horror stories, especially those that have nasty climactic twists, but it is applicable to any story whose conclusion exploits the cruel aspects of the 'irony of fate'". Contes cruels by Auguste Villiers de l'Isle-Adam is the origin of this short story genre name.

Two noted writers in the conte cruel genre are Maurice Level and Patricia Highsmith. H. P. Lovecraft observed of Level's fiction in his essay "Supernatural Horror in Literature" (1927): "This type, however, is less a part of the weird tradition than a class peculiar to itself—the so-called conte cruel, in which the wrenching of the emotions is accomplished through dramatic tantalizations, frustrations, and gruesome physical horrors".

Brian M. Stableford observed that, by the 1980s, the conte cruel was the standard narrative form of soft science fiction, in particular the works of Thomas M. Disch and John Sladek.

== See also ==
- Anthology
- Conte (literature)
- Drabble
- Flash fiction (also called microfiction)
- Irish short story
- Literary journal
- Minisaga
- Sketch story
- Tall tale
- Vignette
