= Conte (literature) =

Genre of prose fiction

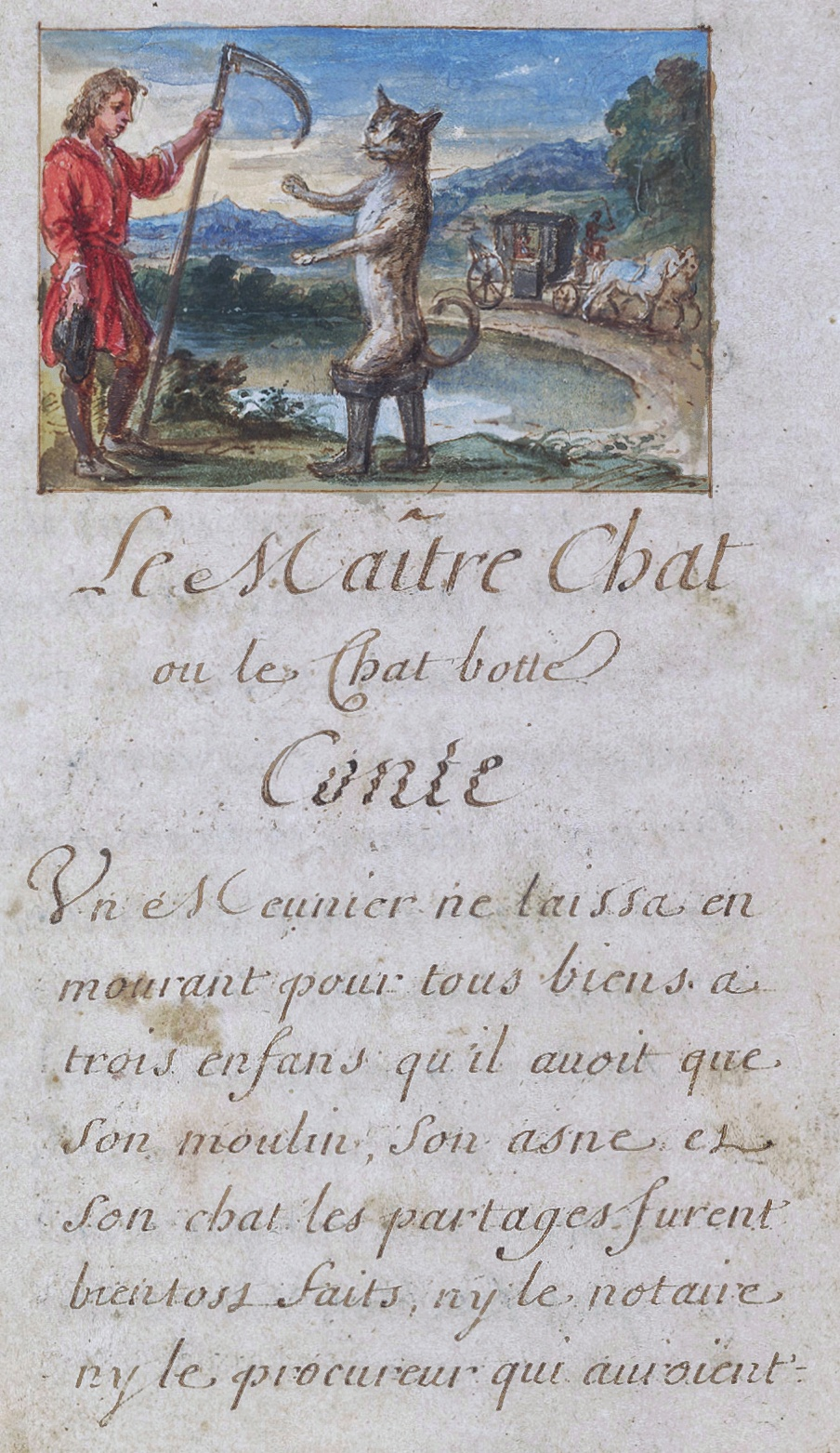
Manuscript of "Puss in Boots" from Histoires ou contes du temps passé

Conte (pronounced [kɔ̃t]) is a literary genre of tales, often short, characterized by fantasy or wit. They were popular in the seventeenth and eighteenth centuries until the genre became merged with the short story in the nineteenth century. Distinguishing contes from other literary genres is notoriously difficult due to the various meanings of the French term conte that span folktales, fairy tales, short stories, oral tales, and fables.

== Definition ==
Conte comes from the French word conter, 'to relate'. The French term conte encompasses a wide range of narrative forms that are not limited to written accounts. No clear English equivalent for conte exists in English as it includes folktales, fairy tales, short stories, oral tales, and to lesser extent fables. This makes conte notoriously difficult to define precisely.

A conte is generally longer than a short story but shorter than a novel. In this sense, contes can be called novellas. Contes are contrasted with short stories not only in length but subject matter. They are generally used to convey morals with a light scenario. Whereas short stories (nouvelles) are about recent ("novel") events, contes tend to be either fairy tales or philosophical stories. Nouvelles, too, could be oral. Contes are often adventure stories, characterized by fantasy, wit, and satire. It may have moral or philosophical underpinnings, but is generally not interested in psychological depth or circumstantial detail. They may be profound, but not "weighty". These generic characteristics also contribute to their short length. Contes can be either in prose or verse.

== History ==
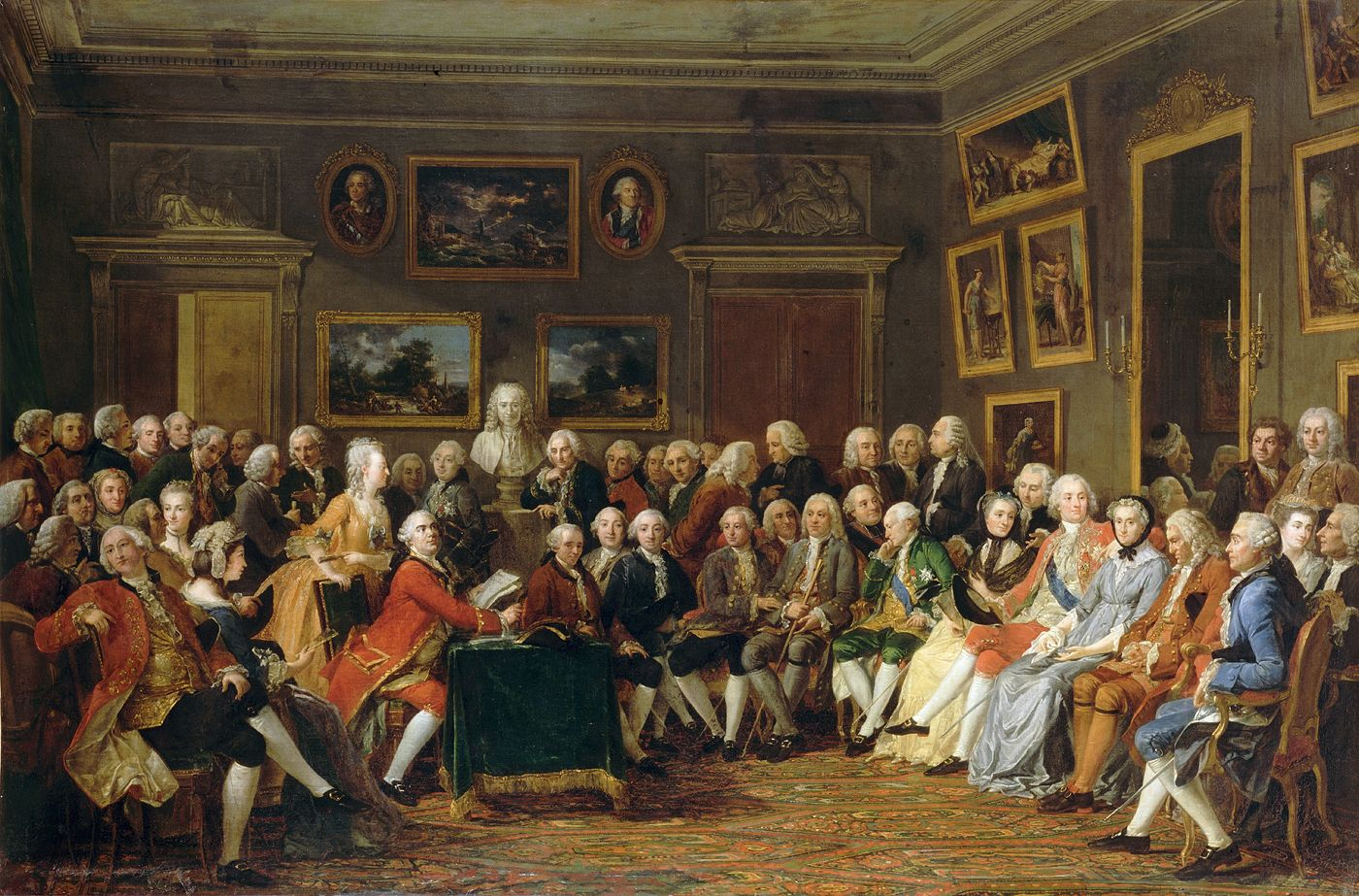
In the Salon of Madame Geoffrin in 1755 by Anicet Charles Gabriel Lemonnier. Reading of Voltaire's L'Orphelin de la Chine in the salon of Marie Thérèse Rodet Geoffrin

Contes were popular in the seventeenth and eighteenth centuries. The distinction between contes and short stories was largely obsolete by the nineteenth century when the genres became merged. Reflective of this, the English term "short story" was coined in 1884 by Brander Matthews.

Famous examples of contes include Contes et nouvelles en vers by Jean de La Fontaine, Histoires ou contes du temps passé by Charles Perrault, and Contes cruels by Auguste Villiers de l'Isle-Adam, the last of which spawned a subgenre called conte cruel.

Voltaire is said to have invented the genre of philosophical conte, also practiced by Denis Diderot. However, according to Edmund Gosse, "those brilliant stories" by Voltaire – Candide, Zadig, L'Ingénu, La Princesse de Babylone, and The White Bull – "are not, in the modern sense, contes at all. The longer of these are romans [novels], the shorter nouvelles, not one has the anecdotical unity required by a conte." While it is possible that Voltaire drew inspiration to his contes from an oral source, namely his performances to Louise Bénédicte de Bourbon early in his career, he only published contes after his exile. The genre is also believed to have been started by Marie-Catherine d'Aulnoy after she published "L'île de la Félicité," in her novel L'Histoire d'Hypolite, comte de Douglas. The group les conteuses, which d'Aulnoy was a part of, significantly contributed to this genre in the late 17th century.

Francophone contes also exist outside of France. For instance, Lafcadio Hearn incorporated creole contes in his works.

== See also ==
- Anthology
- Conte cruel
- Drabble
- Flash fiction, also known as microfiction
- Irish short story
- Literary journal
- Minisaga
- Sketch story
- Tall tale
- Vignette
