= Susana Rodríguez (artist) =

Mexican visual artist (born 1980)

- Born: 1980 (age 45–46); Guadalajara, México
- Occupation: Artist
- Known for: ¿Olvida usted algo? – ¡Ojalá!

Susana Rodríguez (born 1980) is a Mexican visual artist who has had a number of solo exhibitions and has participated in various group exhibitions. Her work often consists of installations.

== Biography ==
Susana Rodríguez was born in Guadalajara, México in 1980. She attended the University of Guadalajara, where she studied visual arts. She was a founding member of the Colectivo de Acción y Creación Artística (Collective of Action and Artistic Creation). In 2006-2007 FONCA (Fondo Nacional para la Cultura y las Artes - National Fund for Culture and the Arts) awarded her a grant for young creators.

== Work ==
In 2008 Rodríguez held a solo exhibition at the Museo Raúl Anguiano in Guadalajara called El día de la langosta (The day of the locust). The theme of the show was the destructive power of humans, and the way in which a small action such as killing a fly can trigger effects in distant regions. It draws on Chaos theory and the Chinese proverb that the flapping wings of a butterfly can be felt across the world, and also has religious undertones. The exhibition attempts the difficult task of depicting the moment of destruction and what happens as a result. It starts with a car that has crashed into a huge tree, represented by an acrylic painting on one wall of the room. It continues with a collage showing the tiny figures of angels and cherubs who live with birds and wild animals, and moves on to a dark room where a fly is hovering in video format. The artist chose the title because a locust is a very passive and quiet creature, but turns into a savage beast when its habitat is disturbed, causing further destruction in a domino effect. A critic has described the work as "silent poetry", using images rather than words.

Rodríguez was inspired by the flash fiction story El emigrante by Luis Felipe Lomelí to create an installation named ¿Olvida usted algo? – ¡Ojalá! that opened in August 2009 at the Casa del Lago in Mexico City. This work explores the idea of a building that perhaps has been destroyed during a storm, but where traces remain of the time when it was inhabited. The outdoor installation is constructed of bricks, concrete, ceramic tiles and a wooden door. The work is ambiguous, leaving it to the viewer to interpret whether the building was destroyed, is in the process of being built, or is complete. The artist has said she addresses the dialectic between construction and destruction as an event that helps us understand and accept the transformation of life as inevitable.

In July 2009 Rodríguez participated with Emily Landon and Katie Murray in the group exhibition The Communication Consideration Coordination at the Kate Werble Gallery in New York. For the exhibition she constructed a "container" that combined sculpture, mural painting and cut vinyl to make a 3-dimensional scene that incorporated the gallery façade. She returned to the Kate Werble Gallery for the exhibition Pinch Pots and Pyramids (October–December 2009), with artists Liliane Lijn, Sam Moyer, Ryan Reggiani, Halsey Rodman and Molly Smith. Her work at this show was based on broken and reassembled ceramic cups.

== Exhibitions ==
Solo exhibitions include:

- 2005: Mil meses, Arena México Arte Contemporáneo
- 2007: Melody, Museo de la Ciudad, Querétaro
- 2008: El día de la langosta (The day of the locust), Museo Raúl Anguiano, Guadalajara
- 2009: -Olvida usted algo? – Ojalá (Did you forget something? - Hopefully), Casa del Lago Juan José Arreola, Mexico City

Group exhibitions in which she has participated include:

- 2006: Performance, Pianonobile, Switzerland
- 2006: Asimétrica, Instituto Cultural Cabañas, Guadalajara
- 2006: El equilibrio y sus derivados (Balance and its derivatives), Casa del Lago Juan José Arreola, Mexico City
- 2007: Standing on one foot, Triangle Projects Space, Texas
- 2008: The best art work in the World (or the portrait of the artist), Charro Negro Galeria, Zapopan
- 2009: The communication, coordination, consideration, Kate Werble Gallery, New York
- 2009: Hecho en casa (Homemade), Museo de Arte Moderno, Mexico City (2009)
- 2009: Bing Bang y otras teorias de Evolución (Big Bang and other theories of evolution), Border, Ciudad de México

In January–March 2010 her work was included in the Mexicali Biennial at the Otis Ben Maltz Gallery.
