= Mexicali Biennial =

Mexican/U.S. arts organization

The MexiCali Biennial is a contemporary visual arts organization which focuses on the border between California and Mexico as a region of aesthetic production. The organization is migratory in nature and showcases exhibitions on both sides of the border. The MexiCali Biennial was originally started as a project critiquing the proliferation of international and regional art biennials and as a result may be shown at any time and at any location. The inaugural exhibition was in 2006 and subsequent programming occurred in the years spanning 2009 through 2010 and again in 2013.

== History ==
The MexiCali Biennial was conceived in 2006 by artists Ed Gomez and Luis G. Hernandez. Curator Pilar Tompkins-Rivas was a founding member and curator of the inaugural exhibitions. The 2006 round of programming first took place at La Casa de la Tia Tina, an artist-run space on the border town of Mexicali, MX before traveling to Chavez Studios in East Los Angeles. Due to the nature of the biennial's programming, the second biennial didn't occur until 2009 through 2010, during which time it took place in four different locations in both Mexico and California. Dr. Amy Pederson Converse joined the board and served as co-curator for the 2009-2013 programming. Pederson Converse was instrumental in conceptualizing the theme for the third MexiCali Biennial, which was cannibalism, specifically in regard to philosopher Cătălin Avramescu's studies of cultural cannibalism and its relationship to colonialism.

== MexiCali Biennial 2006 ==
The 2006 MexiCali Biennial started in the border town of Mexicali, MX, at alternative art and music space La Casa de la Tia Tina before traveling to Chavez Studios in Los Angeles. It included installations and border-crossing interventions by Los Angeles and Mexicali based artists. 2006 California based artists exhibiting in Mexicali:

- Andrew Armstrong
- Jesse Benson
- Gomez Bueno
- Cindy Santos Bravo
- Luis G. Hernandez
- Ed Gomez
- Skylar Haskard
- Gustavo Herrera
- Hugo Hopping
- Kristi Lippire
- Ruben Ochoa
- Mike Rogers
- Matt Wardell

2006 Mexico based artists exhibiting in East Los Angeles:

- Heriberto Castro
- Ismael Castro
- Fernando Corona
- Juan Quintero
- Cristian Franco

Musical guests included Lysa Flores, Olin, DJ Santos, DJ Chips and DJ Magallanes. MexiCali Biennial 2006 curators were Ed Gomez, Luis G. Hernandez and Pilar Tompkins-Rivas.

== MexiCali Biennial 09/10 ==
The second round of programming for the MexiCali Biennial occurred 3 years after the first, spanning two years in four sites in Mexico and California. Venues in Mexico were Casa de Tunel in Tijuana and Mexicali Rose and Sala de Arte UABC in Mexicali. The exhibition culminated in a showcase at OTIS Ben Maltz Gallery in Los Angeles. As with 2006 programming, border interventions, site specific performances and installations occurred along the US/Mexico border, including a soccer game by the artist collective Homeless. MB 09/10 artists:

- Skip Arnold
- Juan Bastardo
- Bordermates
- Anibal Catalan
- Jeff Chabot
- Michelle Chong
- Pablo H. Cobian
- Fernando Corona
- Fundacion Wanna Winnie
- Fidel Hernandez
- Rebeca Hernandez
- Homeless
- Nicholas Kersulis
- Ryan Lamb
- Ivan Limas
- Albert Lopez
- Txema Novelo
- Susana Rodríguez
- Michelle Romero
- Ernesto Rosas
- Joaquin Segura
- Gustavo Siono
- Sergio Torres-Torres
- Jason Wallace Triefenbach

MexiCali Biennial 09/10 curators were Ed Gomez, Luis G. Hernandez and Amy Pederson Converse.

== MexiCali Biennial 2013: Cannibalism in the New World ==
The 2013 programming was the first time that an official theme was conceived for the exhibitions. The theme of Cannibalism was influenced by philosopher Catalin Avramescu's research on the cannibal throughout history, in particular its place in colonialism. MB curator and art historian Amy Pederson Converse states, "There is no need to draw a line between actual and symbolic anthropophagy; they are part of the same system of meaning. Through ingestion, digestion, and subsumation, the cannibal bridges the gap between political science and moral philosophy, nature and civilization, north, south, east and west, the self and the other." Artists chosen for MB 2013 were:

- Fred Alvarado
- Natalia Anciso
- Marycarmen Arroyo Macias
- Ana Baranda
- Juan Bastardo
- Sergio Bromberg
- Helen Cahng
- Matthew Carter
- Carolyn Castano
- Enrique Castrejon
- Tony de los Reyes
- Map Conception: Deborah Diehl & Arzu Arda Kosar
- Dino Dinco and Rafa Esparza
- Veronica Duarte
- Roni Feldman
- Kio Griffith and Carmina Escobar
- Zoe Gruni
- HELLO-O : Michael Dee, Martin Durazo, Ichiro Irie
- Daniel Lara
- Candice Lin
- Juan Luna-Avin
- Matt MacFarland
- Dominic Paul Miller
- Flavia Monteiro
- Nancy Popp
- Peter Bo Rappmund
- Christopher Reynolds
- Cindy Santos Bravo
- Fidelius X

Musical performance by Los Nuevos Maevans. MexiCali Biennial 2013: Cannibalism in the New World was curated by Ed Gomez, Luis G. Hernandez and Amy Pederson Converse. Exhibitions were hosted by alternative art space Mexicali Rose and Vestibulo de la Facultad de Artes, UABC in Mexicali as well as the Vincent Price Art Museum in Los Angeles.

== MexiCali Biennial 2018–2020 ==
The MB 2018-2020 round of programming will examine the character of Calafia and the myth of the island of California. Events and exhibitions occurred at LACE (Los Angeles Contemporary Exhibitions) Hollywood, the Robert and Francis Fullerton Museum (San Bernardino), the Armory Center for the Arts (Pasadena), Steppling Art Gallery (Calexico), Planta Libre Galeria Experimental (Mexicali), the Institute for Cultural Research Museum (Mexicali), i21 art space (Mexicali) and across the US/MX border.

Artists who participated in Calafia: Manifesting the Terrestrial Paradise:

Luis Alonso-Sanchez, Nicole Antebi Antena, Jacinto Astiazarán, Edna Avalos, Abraham Avila, Raul Baltazar, Juan Bastardo, Chelle Barbour, Mely Barragán, Carlos Beltran, Amber Bowser, Miguel Buenrostro, Cali (Claudia Algara), Chris Christion, Cog•nate Collective, Artemisa Clark, Abigail Raphael Collins, Nikki Darling, Yutsil Cruz, Victoria Delgadillo, David de Rozas, DINO DINCO, Dani Dodge, Dean Erdmann, Carmina Escobar, Melora Garcia, Melanie Griffin, Jorge Gutierrez, Rebeca Hernandez, Kenyatta A.C. Hinkle, Xandra Ibarra, Invasorix, Haydeé Jiménez, Kristi Lippire, Keaton Macon, Maya Mackrandilal, Ruben Garcia Marrufo, Max Martinez, Jane C. Mi, Mayte Miranda, Chinwe Okona, noé olivas, Jason Magabo Perez, Adee Roberson, Mónica Rodríguez, Sandy Rodriguez, Julio Romero, Enid Baxter Ryce, Timo Saarelma, Paulina Sánchez, Andrea Santizo, Slanguage, #SNATCHPOWER, Mariangeles Soto-Diaz, Erik Moskowitz, Hillary Mushkin, Jeniffer Pereda, Jessica Sevilla, Sergio Teran, Amanda Trager, Diane Williams, Jenny Yurshansky, and Kim Zumpfe.
