= Halsey Rodman =

American artist

Halsey Rodman (born 1973) is an artist based in New York City.

Rodman was born in Davis, California. He makes installations containing assemblages, videos, photography, text and figurative sculpture, which form mythological narratives. Common motifs in Rodman's work are hexagons, clouds of smoke, pickles and geometric forms

Rodman received his BA from the College of Creative Studies, University of California, Santa Barbara in 1995 and his MFA from Columbia University, New York in 2003.

== Selected exhibitions ==
- 2009: Pinch Pots and Pyramids, Kate Werble Gallery, New York City, with Susana Rodríguez, Liliane Lijn, Sam Moyer, Ryan Reggiani and Molly Smith.
- 2007: The Performative Object, The Institute of Contemporary Art at Maine College of Art
- 2006: The Navigator's Quarters Must Not Be Disturbed, Guild & Greyshkul, New York
- 2005: The Minded Swarm, LACE, Los Angeles
- 2004: drift:shift, Linda Schwartz Gallery, Cincinnati
- 2004: Kis Multiplied, Triple Candie, New York
- 2003: One Enemy vs. 25 Millions of Friends, Kunsthochschule Kassel, Germany
- 2000: One and Many Suns, Caltech University, Pasadena
- 1997: Quartzose, Galleri Tommy Lund, Denmark
