= ¿Olvida usted algo? – ¡Ojalá! =

Art installation by Susana Rodríguez

- Did you forget something? – I wish! (English)
- Artist: Susana Rodríguez
- Year: 2009
- Medium: Bricks, concrete, ceramic tiles, and a wooden door
- Location: Casa del Lago Juan José Arreola; Mexico City

¿Olvida usted algo? – ¡Ojalá! was an exterior installation by Mexican artist Susana Rodríguez that stood in the grounds of the Casa del Lago in Mexico City from 27 August 2009 to 6 September 2009. The work explored the relationship between construction and destruction.

== Work ==
The outdoor installation is constructed of bricks, concrete, ceramic tiles and a wooden door. There are two half-destroyed walls, with an intact door. The work explores the idea of a building that perhaps has been destroyed during a storm, but where traces remain of the time when it was inhabited. The work is ambiguous, leaving it to the viewer to interpret whether the building was destroyed, is in the process of being built, or is complete. The installation also refers to those people that one can imagine being inside or outside the building. It was exhibited in a show curated by Itzel Vargas Plata, which also included the work Gloria Desierta by Emanuel Tovar.

== Interpretation ==
There is no absolute meaning to the work, only the meaning that each spectator considers appropriate. The artist has said she addresses the dialectic between construction and destruction as an event that helps us understand and accept the transformation of life as inevitable. The installation's name is the text of the 2005 flash fiction work El emigrante by Luis Felipe Lomelí. Discussing the title, the author observed that the four words generate many ideas, including ones on subjects you would not normally think about. The story is a perfect title for the project, since one of the most important factors in evolution is learning, which is based on memory.
