= Sun, Stone, and Shadows =

Sun, Stone, and Shadows: 20 Great Mexican Short Stories
- Author: Jorge Hernandez, editor
- Language: English
- Genre: Short stories
- Publication date: 2008
- Publication place: United States
- Media type: Print (Hardback & Paperback)
- ISBN: 978-968-16-8594-2 (US-paperback)

Sun, Stone, and Shadows: 20 Great Mexican Short Stories, edited by Jorge Hernandez, and published by Fondo de Cultura Economica, is a collection of short stories written by Mexican authors born in the first half of the twentieth century.

It is one of the books selected for the National Endowment for the Arts' "Big Read" nationwide literacy initiative.

== Contents ==
Introduction, Jorge Hernandez

The Fantastic Unreal

- My Life with the Wave, by Octavio Paz
- Chac-Mool, by Carlos Fuentes
- History According to Pao Cheng, by Salvador Elizondo
- The Night of Margaret Rose, by Francisco Tario

Scenes from Mexican Reality

- The Mist, by Juan de la Cabada
- The Little Doe, by Jose Revueltas
- The Medicine Man, by Francisco Rojas Gonzalez
- Blame the Tlaxcaltecs, by Elena Garro

The Tangible Past

- The Dinner, by Alfonso Reyes
- Tell Them Not to Kill Me!, by Juan Rulfo
- The Carnival of the Bullets, by Martin Luis Guzman
- Permission Granted, by Edmundo Valades

The Unexpected in Everyday, Urban Life

- The Shunammite, by Ines Arredondo
- Cooking Lesson, by Rosario Castellanos
- Tachas, by Efren Hernandez
- What Became of Pampa Hash?, by Jorge Ibarguengoitia

Intimate Imagination

- The Switchman, by Juan Jose Arreola
- The Square, by Juan Garcia Ponce
- The Panther, by Sergio Pitol
- August Afternoon, by Jose Emilio Pacheco
