= William Guillén Padilla =

Peruvian poet and storyteller (born 1963)

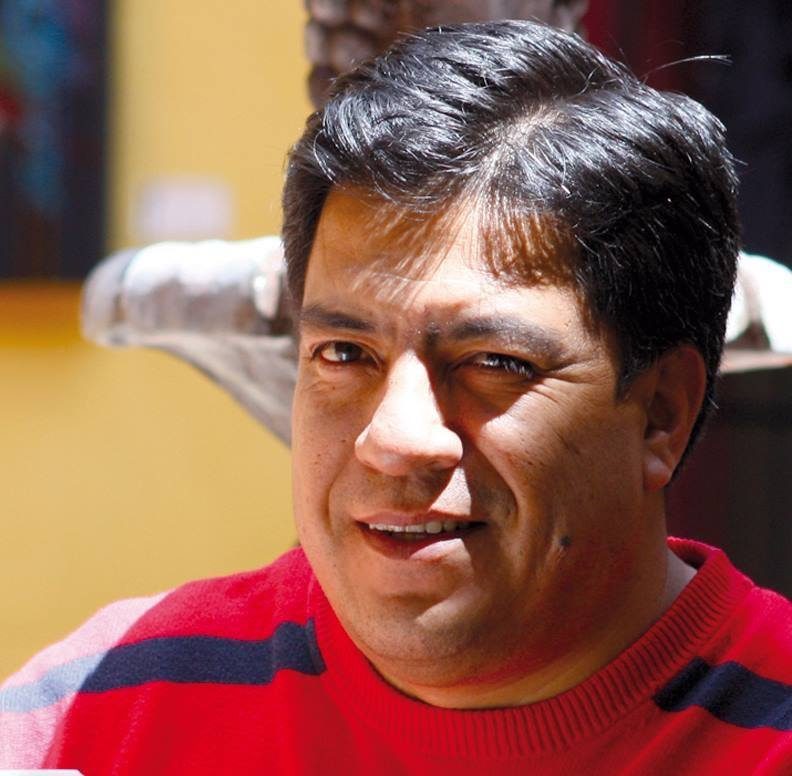
William Guillen Padilla.

William Guillén Padilla (born April 26, 1963) is a Peruvian poet and storyteller. He excels in the genre of literary minifiction. Founder and director of the Feria Virtual del Libro de Cajamarca, Perú.

== Bibliography ==
=== Poetry ===
Year	Spanish title
2004	Soliloquios de Homo Sapiens
2009	Planetario Astral
2011	Memoria del Yo Habitante
2013	Haikus de Kokín
2015	Terruño Color

=== Minifiction ===
Year	Spanish title
2006	Los Escritos del Oidor
2007	Lo que Yo Barman oí
2011	Cuaderno de Almanaquero
2011	Microcuentos (Antología)
2012	77+7 Nanocuentos
2013	Mínimos de Kokín
2013	Abrazo Divino
2013	Historias Heredadas
2014	100 Minis 7D / De fantasmas y entes afines
2014	Zoomínimos
2016	De los elementos (118 relatos químicamente desconocidos)
2017	Fitomínimos
2017	Cien llamas en el llano. Homenaje a Juan Rulfo
2018	Inkacuentos

=== Stories ===
Year	Spanish title
2009	Actos & Relatos
2013	Retorno en Tiempo Real y Siete Cuentos más
2017	Cuentos para Zuva
2023	777 cuentos a lomo de quinde

=== Novel ===
Year	Spanish title
2011	Venus brilla cuatro veces
2016	Fatum Inca

== Awards and distinctions ==
- Lima, 2010 "Libro de Poesía Breve"
- Caracas, 2006 "III Concurso Radial y I Concurso Televisivo de Cuento Breve Librería Mediática" (Finalist)
- Lima, 2010 "XVI Bienal de Cuento 'Premio Copé Internacional'" (Finalist)
- Barcelona, 2012 "Concurso de Microrrelatos 'La Casa Vacía'" (Finalist)
- Ohio, 2016. IV Concurso Internacional de Novela Contacto Latino. (2nd Place)
