= El emigrante (micro story) =

"El emigrante" (The migrant) is a flash fiction story by Mexican writer Luis Felipe Lomelí, published in 2005. It is one of the best-known and most widely cited examples of the genre in Spanish.

== The story ==
-¿Olvida usted algo?

-¡Ojalá!

== Origin ==
The type of micronarrative or microfiction of which "El emigrante" is a famous example has precursors in the 1980s and 1990s with the work of Jacques Sternberg and Philippe Delerm, but perhaps has been brought back to life through the influence of Facebook and Twitter. However, one should not consider micronarrative exclusively as a (post)modern form of literature. Micronarrative is better understood as one of many (re)configurations in the fragmentary writing continuum. In fact, microtexts are as old as literature itself. Old manifestations of brevity in writing include, to name but a few examples, Sumerian and Egyptian instructions and Greek epigrams and aphorisms.

The author explains that the story came from the little sign he kept seeing when leaving buses or airplanes, saying ¿Olvida usted algo? (Did you forget anything?). That made him think of all the things he would like to remember but could not, and the other things he would prefer to forget. Thinking of these things became a private game for him, whenever he saw the sign. He was given a grant by the Mexican Foundation for Literature that included obligatory attendance at a workshop on micro-stories and, without thinking much, wrote the story down. He added ¡Ojalá! (If only!) to the text of the sign to create the story. Later, when taking his book of short stories to the publisher, it struck him that the micro-story summarized all the others, so he added it at the beginning. He had no idea it would become so widely known. In fact, it had already been submitted to a magazine and rejected.

== Publication and reception ==
"El emigrante" appeared in Lomelí's second book, Ella sigue de viaje, published in March 2005. The story may be seen as a summary of the feelings of the characters in the other stories in the book, whether they have left behind love, loneliness or violence. Another story in this book won the Edmundo Valadés Latin American Short Story Prize. The book itself won the prestigious San Luis Potosí national short story award.

"El emigrante", and others in the microfiction genre such as the classic work by Guatemalan writer Augusto Monterroso, "El dinosaurio", present questions that provoke thought and intellectual development. "El emigrante" has become one of the most celebrated and frequently cited of microfiction stories. It is wrongly considered as the shortest story in the Spanish language. (Note: Some supporters say that Monterroso's seven words in one line are shorter than Lomelí's four words in two lines. But the two works both stand as extraordinary examples of the ability of a few short words to evoke mood and provoke thought.) A much shorter story, included in La mitad del diablo (2006) is Juan Pedro Aparicio's "Luis XIV", whose whole text includes a single word: "Yo". Nonetheless, "El emigrante" has brought widespread recognition to the author, who has since moved on to writing a full-length novel, at the opposite end of the extreme.

The story inspired ¿Olvida usted algo? – ¡Ojalá!, an installation by the artist Susana Rodríguez, which opened in August 2009 at the Casa del Lago in Mexico City. Rodríguez's work explores the idea of a building that perhaps has been destroyed during a storm, but where traces remain of the time when it was inhabited. The outdoor installation is constructed of bricks, concrete, ceramic tiles and a wooden door. The work is ambiguous, leaving it to the viewer to interpret whether the building was destroyed, is in the process of being built, or is complete. The artist has said she addresses the dialectic between construction and destruction as an event that helps us understand and accept the transformation of life as inevitable.

== Bibliography ==
- Lomelí, Luis Felipe (2005). Ella sigue de viaje. México: Tusquets Editores. ISBN 970-699-105-0.
