= Casa del Lago Juan José Arreola =

Cultural center in Mexico City, Mexico

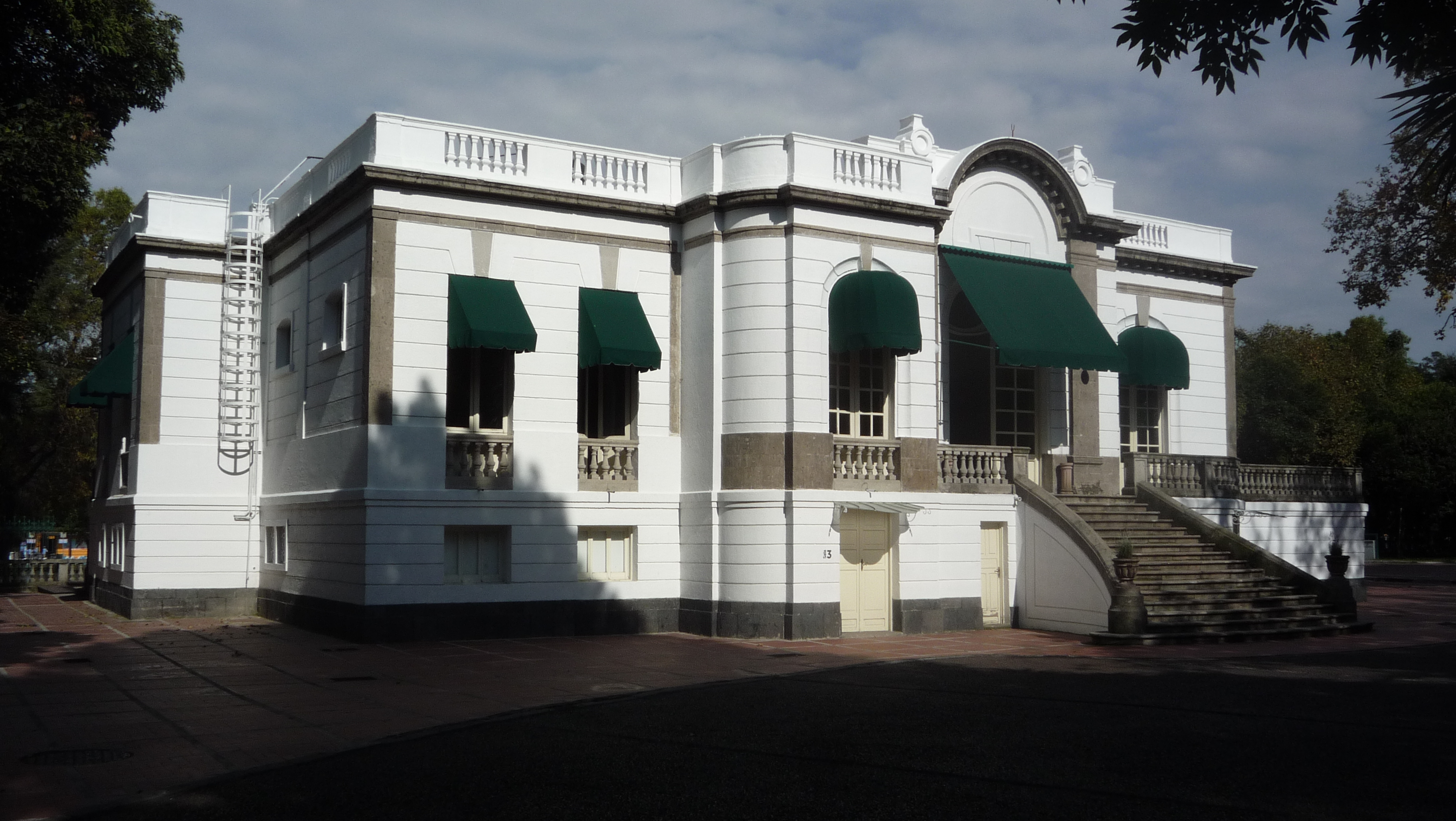
- La Casa del Lago

- Location in Mexico
- Established: 1959
- Coordinates: 19.422655°N 99.186494°W
- Type: Cultural center
- Owner: National Autonomous University of Mexico
- Website: www.casadellago.unam.mx%20www.casadellago.unam.mx

Casa del Lago was instituted in 1959 as the first off-campus Cultural Center of the National Autonomous University of Mexico. It is characterized by its extraordinary ability to promote the cultural and generational encounter between the vanguard and tradition. It was established with Juan José Arreola as its founding director and is located in the Woods of Chapultepec, a traditional Sunday walk area for the inhabitants of the capital.

In each of the artistic disciplines, that have taken place in this multifaceted enclosure, the originality and experimentation have gathered together and allowed the creators to show how the contemporary is not incompatible with the large popular audience that visit it, turn it into an emblematic place in the cultural scene of the city.

== Activities ==
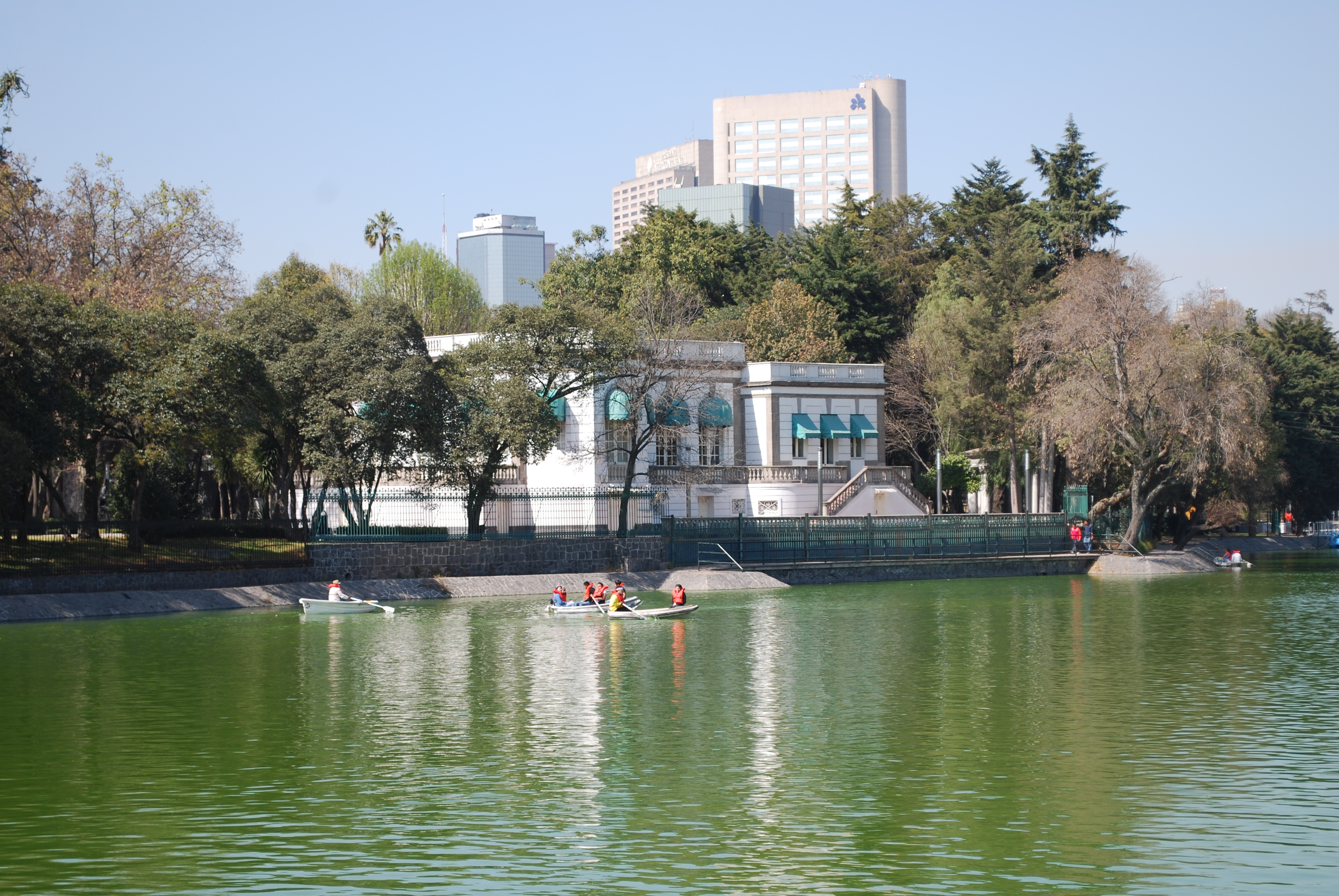
The house as seen from Chapultepec Lake

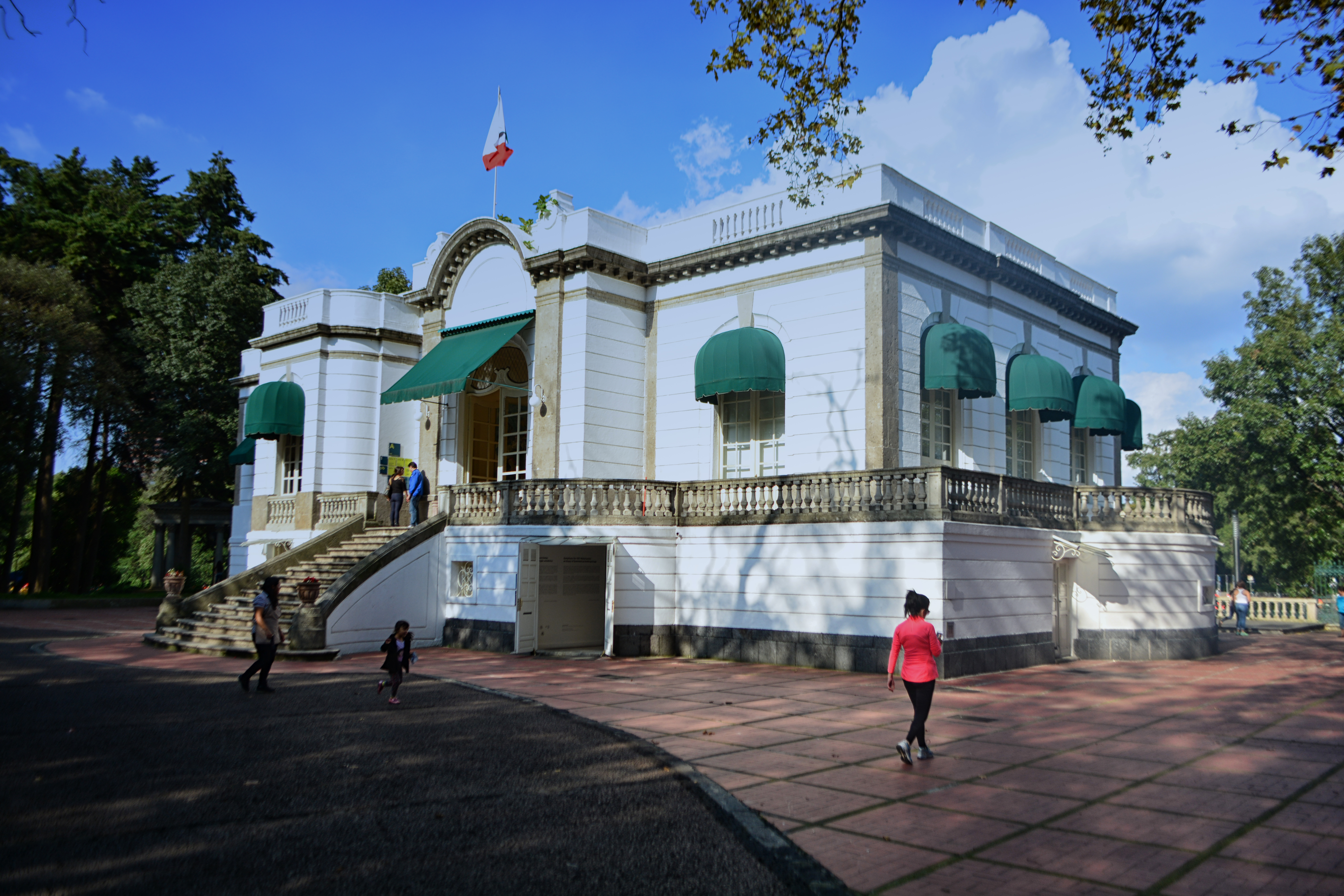
La Casa del Lago

As in the beginning, half a century ago, Casa del Lago, opens its doors to young, national and foreign artists with original and controversial proposals, with a cultural offering where emerging expressions are significant. Intense work is done in the field of visual arts, which provides the necessary means and space for artists of different ages to develop their ideas and their quality curatorial projects. It has also promoted the theatrical work of the younger generation of directors and actors. Dance has brought together the most diverse choreographic styles, all in unconventional spaces.

Alternative and emergent music has been present in diverse groups and soloists playing rock, jazz, tango, flamenco, new song, and new trends of the genres. Chess, driven by Juan José Arreola, is maintained through the various tournaments that are held annually. The Cinema Club has promoted the documentary form in a permanent way through its participation in festivals (Ambulante and DOCSDF) and has opened its spaces to young filmmakers in different film debate cycles. The program of courses and workshops has increased in over 30 disciplines, many with new and critical vision.

It revived, from a contemporary perspective, what initially was known as Poetry Out Loud, just a few years after the inauguration of this university forum in Chapultepec, through a festival that seeks to reclaim this tradition that called thinkers, intellectuals and artist of the time. It links national and international artists of today with prominent poets from different oral traditions, as the "decimistas jarochos", indigenous poets, and the recent generation of young Mexican artists, from new literary currents, where the new musical technologies are also present, the writing in relation to sound, rhythm and the lyric skills of the artist.

Casa del Lago has multiplied its cultural offers in the same way that the university community and the creators and public communities have increased, keeping alive that "dialogue between history and present as a basis of their identity", making permanent that spirit of risk, of its vocation in the search for the experimental, emergent and purposeful, becoming an alternative art site, ideal meeting place for young people and for the people, by their tastes and training. For example, from 27 August 2009 to 6 September 2009 Caso del Lago staged an exhibition of avant-garde installation art in its grounds featuring ¿Olvida usted algo? – ¡Ojalá! by artist Susana Rodríguez and Gloria Desierta by Emanuel Tovar.

Among alumni of the Case del Lago is painter Eva Laura Moraga.

== History ==
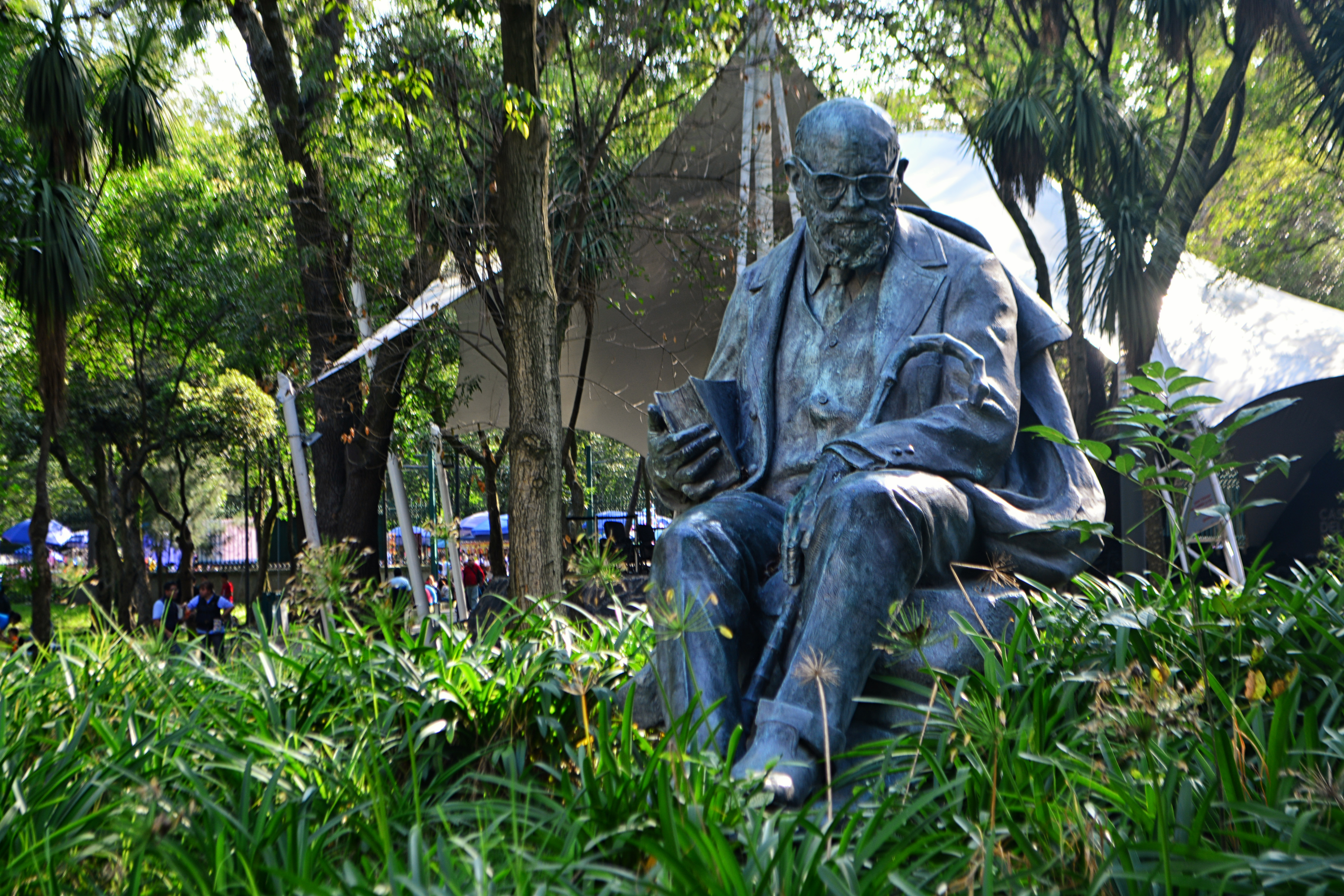
Statue of León Felipe, Mexico City

The construction of the building began in 1906, but it was inaugurated as the headquarters of the first Automobile Club in Mexico until April 30, 1908. In 1929, it was home to the Biological Studies Department of the Ministry of Agriculture and Development (la Dirección de Estudios Biológicos de la Secretaría de Agricultura y Fomento). University autonomy definitely influenced the fate of Casa del Lago joining it to the National University and housing the new Institute for Biology, until 1959 when it moved to the new facilities created in Ciudad Universitaria (University City). On 10 May 1959 the enclosure opened its doors as a center for the promotion and dissemination of culture, but the official opening took place on September 15 of the same year.

By agreement of the rector Juan Ramón de la Fuente 31 January 2002 it was given the name of its founding director: Juan José Arreola, who turned it into the model of the national cultural centre with deep roots and prestige in Latin America, and where, over the past 50 years, representatives of the artistic vanguard of the country have gathered.

Since 1959, the University has undertaken, with extraordinary energy, the avant-garde, the experimentation and the renewal of many of the anachronistic criteria that had been adapted to culture. A new generation began at Casa del Lago when notorious figures such as José Luis Ibáñez, Leonora Carrington, Juan Soriano, Octavio Paz and even Juan José Arreola, who along with Miguel Gonzalez Avelar, to name a few, began to promote Poetry Out Loud, Chess Tournaments and the Philatelic Club.

Tomás Segovia, successor of Arreola, poet and essayist, created an extraordinary group of young writers, among whom Juan García Ponce, short story writer, novelist and playwright, stands out; thanks to his essays and notes about visual arts, he examined and promoted artists like: Vicente Rojo, Lilia Carrillo, José Luis Cuevas, Fernando García Ponce, Alberto Gironella and Manuel Felguerez; giving also a huge boost to the music of young artists through the program Nueva Música en México (New Music in Mexico), which got together people like Joaquín Gutiérrez Heras, Rocío Sanz and other leading artists and composers.

Other figures that embodied the spirit of Casa del Lago were Juan Vicente Melo and Juan José Gurrola. Melo, a dermatologist and music critic, replaced Segovia and developed a task: Conference Cycles of literary authors and composers, small exhibitions of the mentioned artists and plays that renewed the scenic work and vanguard music concerts. Juan José Gurrola, who began as an actor in Poetry Out Loud, always proposed avant-garde attitudes in his staging. It was an extraordinary period for Casa del Lago, awarded by the Association of Theatre and Music Critics for giving room to the artistic compositions of the twentieth century, positioning itself as one of the most renowned cultural centers in the capital of the country.

In 1982 the group called Los Estridentistas attracted public attention due to the confusion created by an exhibition about this literary group of the 20s. The exhibition at the time was the appropriate framework to exhibit the work of 80 sculptors as part of the meeting of sculptors, where they discussed issues related to sculpture and other disciplines.

Casa del Lago also gave shelter to the artists called "the rupture generation" when in 1989 they made an important exhibition in which works that once were rejected by commercial galleries were included. The Documentary Cinema Club gained special significance as a unique space of its kind in the capital.

The evening walks along the Bosque de Chapultepec (Woods of Chapultepec), with the collaboration of the Directorate of the Forest, since 1999 to date, has been a project that the university community and the population have received with great interest, since it has contributed to the rescue of the historical and artistic values of the largest urban park in Latin America.

Casa del Lago serves as a venue for artistic experimentation and the support of emerging creators.

== Location ==
It is located in the heart of the Woods of Chapultepec, where significant work in the diffusion of culture has been done in the last fifty years. It is an emblematic space of Mexico City, where the representatives of the country's cultural vanguard have gathered and which endorses the mission of promoting culture as essential in the integral formation of young university students and the large audience who visit it.

It has developed an intense program of activities including expositions, rock concerts and alternative music, conferences, courses and workshops, Festival of Poetry Out Loud and everything related to emerging and experimental arts.

== Notable people ==
- Thelma Nava (1932–2019), poet, magazine co-founder, publisher, journalist
