= My Life at First Try =

2008 flash fiction novel

- Author: Mark Budman
- Language: English
- Genre: Novel
- Publisher: Counterpoint Press
- Publication date: November 28, 2008 (First edition, Hardcover)
- Publication place: United States
- Media type: Print (Hardcover)
- Pages: 240 pages
- ISBN: 1-58243-400-X

My Life at First Try is a 2008 semi-autobiographical flash fiction novel by Mark Budman that was published by Counterpoint Press.

== Summary ==
My Life at First Try follows the character of Alex, who was born in 1950s Soviet Union. Alex hopes for a future where two things come to pass: he becomes a writer and meets his American cousin Annie. He also wants to overcome the bleakness of the Soviet Union and become someone a carefree foreigner akin to some tourists he saw as a child. However, as he grows the institutionalized nature of his surroundings dims these dreams. When he and his family moves to America in the 80s, Alex finally gets to fulfill his wish of being a foreigner, only to discover that rather than being carefree, his new life feels alien to him and it's up to him to try to find his own self-fulfillment.

== Reception ==
Critical reception for My Life at First Try was mixed to positive, with Kirkus Reviews calling the book "a funny, little-seen version of the American dream". The Washington Post wrote that while readers won't want to stop reading, "Budman's success with this form is uneven, and too many wonderful scenes seem truncated or prematurely abandoned when he breaks off for the next year". Publishers Weekly and People Magazine both reviewed the book, with Publishers Weekly giving a positive review.
