= Robert Scotellaro =

American writer and poet

Robert Scotellaro is an American writer and poet known for his flash fiction.

His flash fiction has appeared in such publications as Flash: The International Short-Short Story Magazine Blink Ink and the New Flash Fiction Review. Reviews and articles about his work have appeared in the San Francisco Chronicle and Writer's Digest.

== Fiction ==
- From the Book of Atmospheres (Bamboo Dart Press, 2025)
- Breath and Shadow: Six-Sentence Stories (With Meg Pokrass) (MadHat Press, 2024)
- Quick Adjustments (Blue Light Press, 2023)
- God in a Can (Bamboo Dart Press, 2022)
- Ways to Read the World (Scantic Books, 2022)
- What Are the Chances? (Press 53, 2020)
- Nothing Is Ever One Thing (Blue Light Press, 2019)
- Bad Motel (Big Table Publishing, 2016)
- What We Know So Far (Blue Light Press, 2015)
- Measuring the Distance (Blue Light Press, 2012)

== Anthology ==
- New Micro: Exceptionally Short Fiction (Edited by James Thomas and Robert Scotellaro, W.W. Norton & Co., 2018)

== Poetry ==
- After the Revolution (White Knuckle Press, 2014)
- The Night Sings A Cappella (Big Table Publishing, 2011)
- Rhapsody of Fallen Objects (Flutter Press, 2010)
- My Father’s Cadillac (Six-Shooter Press, 1984)
- Early Love Poems of Genghis Khan (Lion's Breath Press, 1979)
- Blinded by Halos (Lion's Breath Press, 1978)
- East Harlem Poems (Vagabond Press, 1977)

== Children's books ==
- The Terrible Storm (Cricket Books, 2016)
- Snail Stampede and Other Poems (Hands Up Books, 2004)
- Dancing with Frankenstein and Other Limericks (Hands Up Books, 2003)
- Daddy Fixed the Vacuum Cleaner (Willowisp Press, 1993)

== Nonfiction ==
- The Joy of Friendship (Meadowbrook Press, 1996, Distributed by Simon and Schuster)
