= Jake Bible =

American novelist

- Born: Jacob David Bible; Bellevue, Washington, U.S.
- Occupations: Novelist, short story author
- Writing career
- Period: 2009–present
- Genres: Science fiction, Horror fiction
- Website: www.jakebible.com

Jake Bible (born Jacob David Bible) is an American science fiction and horror fiction author. He was nominated in 2015 for the Bram Stoker Award in the category of Superior Achievement in a Young Adult Novel (Intentional Haunting, Permuted Press).

Bible is the author of the Apex Trilogy, Z-Burbia and other series and has published over thirty novels, other works and short stories. He is the host of professional writing podcast Writing in Suburbia.

== Drabble ==
Jake Bible's use of the Drabble format (very brief fiction of 100 words) began as an "exercise in character and plot development." He then realized that individual drabbles could easily be moved "around to control pacing and timing of the narrative." In August 2009, Bible released the first episode of his podcast and the very first Drabble Novel called Dead Mech. In 2013, Dead Mech and the rest of the Apex Trilogy was picked up by Severed Press, an independent publisher of horror and science fiction. Bible continues his Drabble exercises on a weekly basis through his Friday Night Drabble Party.

== Novels ==
Published*	Title	Publisher	Series
2018-04-13	Blood Ghast Blues	Bell Bridge Books	Black Box Inc. Series, Book 2
2018-04-09	Paradox Slaughter	Severed Press	A Roak: Galactic Bounty Hunter Novel, Book 4
2018-02-20	Agent Prime	Severed Press	
2018-01-17	Galactic Vice	Severed Press	A Jafla Base Vice Squad Novel, Book 1
2017-11-12	Mega 6: No Man’s Island	Severed Press	Mega, Book 6
2017-10-20	Black Box Inc.	Bell Bridge Books	Black Box Inc. Series, Book 1
2017-09-17	Razer Edge	Severed Press	A Roak: Galactic Bounty Hunter Novel, Book 3
2017-06-01	Nebula Risen	Severed Press	A Roak: Galactic Bounty Hunter Novel, Book 2
2017-04-30	Mech Corps	Severed Press	
2017-03-29	EverRealm: A LitRPG Novel	Severed Press	Level Dead, Book 1
2017-02-24	Stone Cold Bastards	Bell Bridge Books	
2017-02-17	Outpost Hell	Severed Press	
2016-12-03	Roak	Severed Press	A Roak: Galactic Bounty Hunter Novel, Book 1
2016-09-11	Mega 5: Murder Island	Severed Press	Mega, Book 5
2016-07-24	Fighting Iron 2: Perdition Plains	Severed Press	Fighting Iron, Book 2
2016-05-23	Salvage Merc One: The Daedalus System	Severed Press	Salvage Merc One, Book 2
2016-04-18	Drop Team Zero	Severed Press	
2016-03-10	Z-Burbia 7: Sisters of the Apocalypse	Severed Press	Z-Burbia, Book 7
2016-02-09	Fighting Iron	Severed Press	Fighting Iron, Book 1
2016-01-17	Salvage Merc One	Severed Press	Salvage Merc One, Book 1
2015-12-07	Blood Cruise	Severed Press	
2015-11-19	Dead Team Alpha 2: The Stronghold	Severed Press	Dead Team Alpha, Book 2
2015-10-11	Mega 4: Behemoth Island	Severed Press	Mega, Book 4
2015-10-06	Reign of Four: IV	Permuted Press	Reign of Four, Book 4
2015-09-29	ScareScapes Book Six: Into the Black!	Permuted Press	ScareScapes, Book 6
2015-09-04	Kaiju Inferno	Severed Press	Kaiju Winter, Book 3
2015-09-01	Reign of Four: III	Permuted Press	Reign of Four, Book 3
2015-08-25	ScareScapes Book Five: End of Life Exams!	Permuted Press	ScareScapes, Book 5
2015-08-04	Reign of Four: II	Permuted Press	Reign of Four, Book 2
2015-07-28	ScareScapes Book Four: Attack of the Living Shadows!	Permuted Press	ScareScapes, Book 4
2015-07-12	Z-Burbia 6: Rocky Mountain Die	Severed Press	Z-Burbia, Book 6
2015-07-07	Reign of Four: I	Permuted Press	Reign of Four, Book 1
2015-06-30	ScareScapes Book Three: The Sleepwalking Dead!	Permuted Press	ScareScapes, Book 3
2015-06-02	AntiBio 2: The Control War	Severed Press	AntiBio, Book 2
2015-05-26	ScareScapes Book Two: Systems Failure!	Permuted Press	ScareScapes, Book 2
2015-05-26	ScareScapes Book One: Phantom Limbs!	Permuted Press	ScareScapes, Book 1
2015-04-01	In Perpetuity	Severed Press	
2015-01-20	Z-Burbia 5: The Bleeding Heartland	Severed Press	Z-Burbia, Book 5
2014-12-12	Kaiju Storm	Severed Press	Kaiju Winter, Book 2
2014-11-03	Mega 3: When Giants Collide	Severed Press	Mega, Book 3
2014-10-15	Intentional Haunting	Permuted Press	
2014-08-30	Z-Burbia 4: Cannibal Road	Severed Press	Z-Burbia, Book 4
2014-06-10	Kaiju Winter	Severed Press	Kaiju Winter, Book 1
2014-05-18	Little Dead Man	Permuted Press	
2014-05-09	Mega 2: Baja Blood	Severed Press	Mega, Book 2
2014-04-01	AntiBio	Severed Press	AntiBio, Book 1
2014-03-03	Dead Team Alpha	Severed Press	Dead Team Alpha, Book 1
2014-02-03	Z-Burbia 3: Estate Of The Dead	Severed Press	Z-Burbia, Book 3
2014-01-01	Mega	Severed Press	Mega, Book 1
2013-11-10	Z-Burbia 2: Parkway To Hell	Severed Press	Z-Burbia, Book 2
2013-12-28	Z-Burbia	Severed Press	Z-Burbia, Book 1
2013-08-12	Metal and Ash	Severed Press	The Apex Trilogy, Book 3
2013-08-14	The Americans	Severed Press	The Apex Trilogy, Book 2
2013-07-02	Dead Mech	Severed Press	The Apex Trilogy, Book 1

*dates are based on the release of the Kindle version

== Short stories ==
Published*	Story Title	Collection Title
2013-07-25	Blister	Dead Ends
2014-05-02	Geared For Evil	The Way of the Gun: A Bushido Western Anthology
2015-05-26	The Rider	Anything but Zombies: A Short Story Anthology
2015-06-15	Rollin' Death	Lawless Lands: Takes from the Weird Frontier
2016-10-24	One-Up-One-Down	We Are Not This: Carolina Writers for Equality
2017-09-12	Tinkerman	For a Few Credits More: More Stories from the Four Horsemen Universe
2018-04-19	One Eye Watches the Road	Monstrous (Tapas Web Anthology)

*dates are based on the release of the Kindle version
