= Grant Faulkner =

American writer

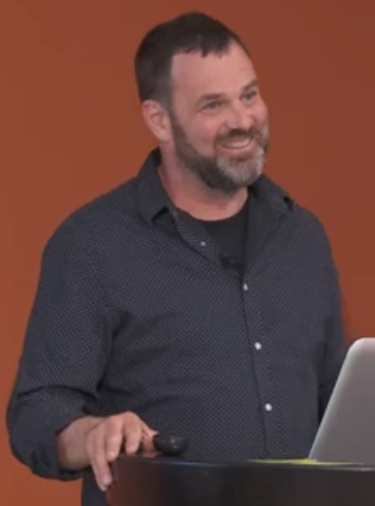
- Giving a talk at the San Francisco Public Library in 2018
- Education: Grinnell College (BA); San Francisco State University (MA)
- Occupations: Fiction writer, essayist, entrepreneur
- Spouse: Heather Mackey
- Children: 2
- Writing career
- Notable works: Fissures; Pep Talks for Writers: 52 Insights and Actions to Boost Your Creative Mojo; All the Comfort Sin Can Provide The Art of Brevity

Grant Faulkner is an American writer, the co-founder and co-host of the Memoir Nation podcast, the co-founder of the online literary journal 100 Word Story, an executive producer of America's Next Great Author, and the former executive director of National Novel Writing Month (NaNoWriMo).

== Biography ==
Grant Faulkner was born and raised in Oskaloosa, Iowa. He earned a B.A. in English from Grinnell College and an M.A. in creative writing from San Francisco State University. He lives in Berkeley, California, with his wife, the writer Heather Mackey.

In 2011, Faulkner and Lynn Mundell co-founded 100 Word Story, an online literary journal that publishes stories that are exactly 100 words long. Stories published in 100 Word Story have been included on Wigleaf's Top (Very) Short Fictions list and anthologized in the annual Best Small Fictions series and W.W. Norton's New Micro: Exceptionally Short Fiction.

From 2012 to 2023, he was executive director of National Novel Writing Month (NaNoWriMo), taking over from founder Chris Baty. In an interview, he claimed that nearly 500,000 people, including nearly 100,000 kids and teens participated in the event. He left to focus on developing the TV show, America's Next Great Author, as an executive producer.

In 2014, Faulkner co-founded the Flash Fiction Collective, a reading series in San Francisco, with writers Jane Ciabattari and Meg Pokrass. Kristen Chen joined the trio in 2015.

In 2018, Faulkner launched the podcast Write-minded: Weekly Inspiration for Writers with co-host Brooke Warner of SheWrites.com. Warner and Faulkner co-founded Memoir Nation in 2025, which provides the inspiration, guidance, structure, and support to equip people creatively, emotionally, and psychologically to write their life story. They rebranded the podcast Memoir Nation to better support the writers who became members of Memoir Nation.

Additionally, Faulkner serves on the National Writing Project's Writer's Council, Left Margin Lit's Advisory Council, Aspen Words' Creative Council, and the Litquake's Board of Directors.

== Literary work ==
Faulkner's stories and essays have appeared in dozens of publications, including The New York Times, Poets & Writers, Writer's Digest, Lit Hub, Tin House, The Southwest Review, The Gettysburg Review, Five Points, Green Mountains Review, and Puerto del Sol. His stories have also been anthologized in W.W. Norton's New Micro: Especially Short Fiction, Best Small Fictions 2016, the Best Microfiction, Norton's Flash Fiction America, Best Small Fictions 2016, the Best Microfiction series, and Bloomsbury's Short-Form Creative Writing, among others.

In 2015, Faulkner released Fissures, a collection of one hundred 100-word stories, published by Press 53.

One reviewer wrote, "In Grant Faulkner's collection of very short fiction, Fissures [One Hundred 100-Word Stories], Faulkner manages to elevate his language, presenting each word here with the rhetorical weight of a novel and with a poetic aptitude that is anything but self-indulgent. Faulkner has, instead, carefully crafted these stories, and each word comes at the reader as high currency."

The 100-word story form is often likened to prose poetry, which is one thing that drew Faulkner to the form. "I've always liked forms that blur," he said. "To say that a piece of writing is a prose poem versus a story is just a matter of an author's intention, an author's definition." In 2018, he co-edited a collection of the best stories published in 100 Word Story, Nothing Short of 100: Selected Tales from 100 Word Story with Lynn Mundell and Beret Olsen.

Faulkner is also known for his writings on the creative process. In 2017, Faulkner published Pep Talks for Writers: 52 Insights and Actions to Boost Your Creative Mojo. In 2019, he co-authored Brave the Page, a teen writing guide. His book on flash fiction, The Art of Brevity, was published in 2023 by the University of New Mexico Press.

Faulkner regularly presents at conferences, including the Frankfurt Book Fair, Book Expo America, the Bay Area Book Festival, Litquake, the Writer's Digest Conference, and the San Francisco Writers Conference, among others.

== List of works ==
=== Books ===
- The Art of Brevity: Crafting the Very Short Story (University of New Mexico Press, February 2023)
- All the Comfort Sin Can Provide
- Brave the Page: A Young Writers Guide to Telling Epic Stories (2019)
- Nothing Short of 100: Selected Tales from 100 Word Story
- Pep Talks for Writers: 52 Insights and Actions to Boost Your Creative Mojo
- Fissures

=== Selected short stories ===
- "Charms" - Fiction Southeast
- "First Time" - New Flash Fiction Review
- "Us" - decomP
- "Six Stories About Gerard and Celeste" - Paragraph Magazine
- "Bright Mess" - Superstition Review
- "Bodies at Risk in Motion" - Green Mountains Review
- "Castings" - Counterexample Poetics
- "Dear X" - Flash Flood
- "Filter" - The Cortland Review
- "The Filmmaker: Eight Takes" - Eclectica
- "Model Upside Down on the Stairs" - PANK
- "Life Knowledge" - Revolver
- "The Names of All Things" - The Southwest Review

=== Essays ===
- 13 Ways of Looking at Flash Fiction– Lit Hub
- "Life By the Bay: A Moveable Feast That Moved When I Wasn't Looking" Lit Hub
- Rejection's Gift: Divine Dissatisfaction– Poets & Writers
- Imagination Under Pressure – Poets & Writers
- The Art of Seduction: How to Entice and Captivate Your Readers – Writer's Digest
- One Hundred Reasons Why I Write - National Writing Project
- Naked (On the Page) and Afraid - Writer's Digest
- Writing Flash Fiction: Telling a Story with What's Left Out - Writer's Digest
- More Ideas Faster: Writing With Abandon - Poets & Writers
- Going Long. Going Short. - New York Times Draft Blog
- What Makes NaNoWriMo Work: Breaking Down the Mythology of the Solitary Writer - Writer's Digest

=== Selected interviews ===
- A Salve for Our General Malaise: Grant Faulkner Interviewed by Taylor Larsen-Bomb Magazine
- All the Comfort Sin Provides– First Draft
- "Stories That Matter"– The Nob Hill Gazette
- "Shards and Gems": An Interview With Guest Reader Grant Faulkner - Smokelong Quarterly
- The Writer's Digest Podcast, Episode 8: Interview with NaNoWriMo Executive Director Grant Faulkner - Writer's Digest
- A Flash Fiction Roundtable: Short but Never Small - Millions
- An Interview with Grant Faulkner - Superstition Review
- An Interview with Grant Faulkner, author of Fissures - Fiction Southeast
- The Write Stuff: Grant Faulkner on Watching Objects Rust and the Slow Reveal - SF Weekly's Litseen
- How could creative expression not change the world? Interview with Grant Faulkner - Art Is Moving
- Grant Faulkner: A Modern Day Pioneer Inspiring Creativity Through Writing – Unzpipped
- An Interview with NaNoWriMo's New Executive Director – NaNoWriMo blog
