= 100 Word Story =

- Discipline: Literary magazine
- Language: English
- Edited by: Grant Faulkner & Lynn Mundell

Publication details
- History: 2011–present
- Frequency: Quarterly

Standard abbreviations
- ISO 4: 100 Word Story

Links
- Journal homepage

100 Word Story is a literary magazine that was founded in 2011 by writers Grant Faulkner and Lynn Mundell in Berkeley, California. It publishes stories and essays that are exactly 100 words in length (also known as a drabble); each piece is published with an accompanying photo.

The 100-word format forces the writer to question each word as they write it. The brevity of the form, and the magazine's presentation, allows the writer to "keep a story free from an explanation," in the spirit of Walter Benjamin's philosophy of storytelling. The magazine reads submissions throughout the year.

== History ==
The idea for 100 Word Story originated when Faulkner read Paul Strohm's 100-word stories that were published in Eleven Eleven Magazine. At the time, Faulkner was working on a long novel, and he became entranced by writing in such a succinct, compressed form. In a 2014 interview, Faulkner explained:

"Writing these smaller pieces was a nice break, and since I could squeeze them into a somewhat-frenzied life as a working parent, they gave me a great sense of creative satisfaction ... I could actually finish something."

In 2011, Faulkner and Mundell decided to create a journal that was exclusively dedicated to 100-word stories; this journal became 100 Word Story. Beret Olsen came on as photo editor in 2014. In 2015, Faulkner published a collection of his own 100-word stories, Fissures. He has also contributed essays about flash fiction to The New York Times, Poets & Writers, Writer's Digest, and The Writer. Regarding the challenge of the form, Faulkner and Mundell are often asked if a story can be told in only 100 words; however, they have both argued that most of the stories they publish have the same three-act structure of a conventional short story. Mundell described a good 100-word story as the following:

" One-fourth character, one-fourth setting, one-fourth point of view, one-fourth plot. Fold all together gently, layering into a Pyrex dish. Heat it up in the oven or stow it in the freezer, depending on how you want it to taste. Then let it sit overnight. Test with a tablespoon. If it stands up, the story is ready. If not, wait another day. Serve on a paper plate."

In another essay, Faulkner said that he learned that each line of a flash story carries a symbolic weight that moves the story forward; at the same time, gaps within and around the story speak as large as the text itself.

== Publications ==
In 2018, Outpost19 published an anthology of 100 Word Story's best pieces, entitled Nothing Short of 100: Selected Tales from 100 Word Story. In April 2018, the book was featured as a recommended read on Lit Hub. In May 2018, The Millions featured a round table discussion on flash fiction with the book's editors and authors.

Many of its stories have been included in a number of anthologies, including W.W. Norton's anthology New Micro: Exceptionally Short Fiction and the annual Best Small Fictions series. Its stories are also routinely included in Wigleaf's annual long- and short-lists of best flash fiction.

== Reception ==
In a review of the magazine, the Review Review, a publication that critiques literary magazines, said:

"100 Word Story is not your average literary find on the web. It challenges both the reader and the potential writer to choose carefully images and words brought forth while reading and creating. The reader has the challenge of taking the 100-word limit to mindfully fill in the spaces of the story using their own experiences and imagination to take from the story what will best fill them with a complete picture. The writer also faces this challenge by working in a backward manner to extract parts of the story that do not move it to a conclusion in an effort to meet the 100-word count. The fascinating task to say the least."

Of the anthology, Nothing Short of 100, author Amber Sparks said:

"These beautifully economical short stories (yes, truly stories) are photographs built with words. They capture a moment and a lifetime, a fraction and a whole. They are epics the size of sound bites, and they prove once and for all that size doesn't matter. Just the stories that fit inside."

== See also ==
- List of literary magazines
