= Statue of Juan José Arreola =

Statue in Guadalajara, Jalisco, Mexico

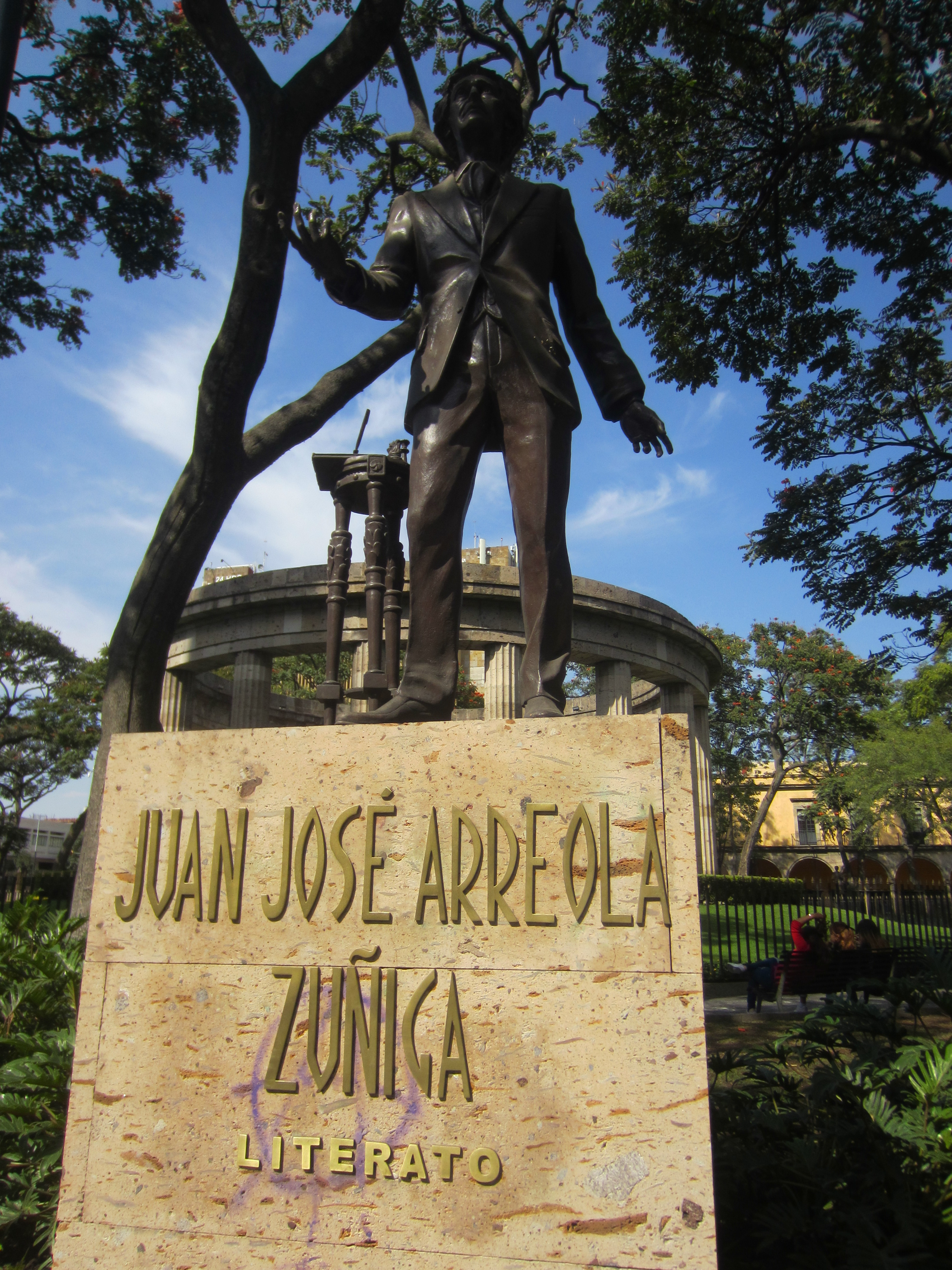
- The statue in 2021
- Artist: Rubén Orozco
- Year: 2015
- Medium: Bronze sculpture
- Subject: Juan José Arreola
- Weight: 220 kg
- Location: Guadalajara, Jalisco, Mexico; 20°40′39.1″N 103°20′49″W

A statue of Juan José Arreola is installed along the Rotonda de los Jaliscienses Ilustres, in Centro, Guadalajara, in the Mexican state of Jalisco. The statue was installed on 20 September 2015 and inaugurated the next day, the 97th anniversary of his birth. His remains rest there. It is a bronze statue that weighs 220 kilograms (490 lb) and features Arreola with his right hand slightly raised. It was created by Rubén Orozco, aided by Claudia and Orso Arreola, Juan José's offspring.
