= Antonio Peláez =

Spanish-Mexican artist (1921–1994)

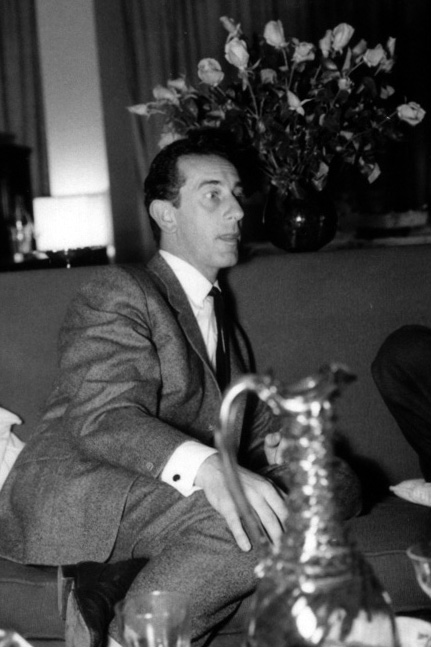
Antonio Pelaez in 1960

Antonio Peláez (1921–1994) was a Mexican artist of Spanish origin, who began his career in portraits but in the 1950s shifted to abstract art, concerned with texture, color and the use of space. His work was recognized by a retrospective at the Palacio de Bellas Artes, membership in the Salón de la Plástica Mexicana and a tribute by the Universidad Autónoma Metropolitana after his death.

== Life ==
Antonio Peláez was born in Llanes, Asturias in the north of Spain in 1921. He grew up in an artistic family and was drawn to music, literature and painting at an early age, exploring these through drawing and painting while still in Spain, studying there to the high school level and beginning his art studies at the Pérez Galdós Institute in Madrid. He immigrated to Mexico in 1936, obtaining Mexican citizenship in 1937. He continued his art studies at Escuela Nacional de Pintura, Escultura y Grabado "La Esmeralda", where he met other artists who influenced his work, if not directly, then through conversations and other contact. Pélaez is the brother of the Mexican writer Francisco Tario.

In the 1940s, he traveled for five years in Europe, to Italy, France, Greece and Egypt, where he studied the works of Antoni Tàpies, Jean Dubuffet, Robert Motherwell, Louise Nevelson, Robert Rauschenberg and Mark Rothko .

Peláez died at the age of 73 in Mexico City.

== Career ==
Peléaz began his career in the 1940s, working for a year in the workshop of Jesús Guerrero Galván. In 1942, he created a series of self-portraits and a decade later he published a book with the portraits of twenty Mexican women including Inés and Carolina Amor, Lola Alvarez Bravo, Frida Kahlo, María Asúnsolo, Lupe Marín and Dolores del Río.

After spending time in Europe, he began exhibiting his artwork in Mexico, starting with the Galería de Arte Contemporáneo in 1952, after being introduced by Frida Kahlo. This was followed by another in the same venue in 1956, and then in various sites in Mexico and countries such as France, Spain and Israel, including a successful exhibition at the X São Paulo Art Biennial, Brazil. Notable appearance in collective exhibitions include the Autorretrato and obra in 1965 at the Museo de Arte Moderno, the Confrontación 66 exhibit at the Palacio de Bellas Artes and the Travesia de la escritura event at the Carrillo Gil Museum in 1980. In 1973, the Palacio de Bellas Artes held a retrospective of his work with his last exhibition during his lifetime in 1981 at the Museo de Arte Moderno. After his death, the Universidad Autónoma Metropolitana held an exhibition and tribute of his work in 2001.

His work has been written about by people such as Octavio Paz, Ramón Xirau, Edmundo O'Gorman, Justino Fernández and Margarita Nelken, with articles and reproductions of his works published in Mexico, France and the United States. He was accepted as a member of the Salón de la Plástica Mexicana His work can be found in the permanent collections of the Museo de Arte Moderno, the modern art museums of Madrid, Tel-Aviv and Philadelphia.

== Artistry ==
In the 1940s, Peláez concentrated on portrait work, both of himself and others. Although compared to those done by Manuel Rodríguez Lozano and Juan Soriano, Octavio Paz noted that the teenaged painter was not impressed with the dominant artistic trends in Mexico at the time (such as Mexican muralism) and who work did not show influence from it. Instead, Paz notes that elements of his later abstract work could be seen even in these portraits.

Influences on Peláez's work include Nicolas de Staël and Antoni Tàpies but it was contact with the person and art of Rufino Tamayo that prompted the artist to gradually abandon figurative painting during the 1950s. Instead, Peláez became interested in texture, tact and space, with elements such as sand, rocks suns, phases of the moon, spheres, curs with colors such as ochre and yellow and especially white. The earth was a center of many of his pieces but generally how it related to the sun and stars. These works lost any sense of narration and even were created to interact with urban wall space.

Peláez considered himself a mathematician in the composition of his works. Octavio Paz wrote “Peláez paints the space of the space: the painting is the wall and the wall is the painting; the space from which the rest of the spaces radiate, the sea, the sky, the plains, the horizon, another wall.
