= David Gaffney =

British writer

David Gaffney is a British writer well known for his flash fiction.

His work has appeared in such publications as Flash: The International Short-Short Story Magazine, Bad Idea, and Ambit.

He was the 2015 flash-fiction judge for the Bridport Prize.

== Collections ==
- Sawn-Off Tales (2006)
- Aromabingo (2009)
- The Half-Life of Songs (2010)
- More Sawn-Off Tales (2013)
- Concrete Fields (2023)

== Novels ==
- Never Never (2008)
- All The Places I've Ever Lived (2017)
- The Three Rooms in Valerie's Head (2018)
- Rivers (2021)
- Out Of The Dark (2022)
