= The Switchman =

The Switchman (Original title: El Guardagujas) is an existentialist short story by Mexican writer Juan José Arreola. The short story was originally published as a confabulario, a word created in Spanish by Arreola, in 1952, in the collection Confabulario and Other Inventions. It was republished ten years later along with other published works by Arreola at that time in the collection El Confabulario total. The story revolves around a "stranger" who wishes to travel to the town of T. by train, but is quickly met by a "switchman" who tells him more and more fantastical stories about the train system while they are waiting.

== Plot ==
A stranger carrying a large suitcase runs towards a train station, and manages to arrive exactly at the time that his train bound for a town identified only as T. is scheduled to depart. As the man speculates about where his train might be, he feels a touch on his shoulder and turns to see a small old man dressed like a railroader and carrying a lantern. When he asks if the train has left, the old man wonders if the traveler has been in the country very long and advises him to find lodging at the local inn for at least a month. The stranger is very confused; he has no plans to stay. The "switchman" tells the stranger that the country is famous for its railroad system; though many timetables and tickets have been produced, the trains do not follow them well. The residents accept this system, but hope for a change in the system.

The stranger wants to know if a train going to T. passes through the station, but the switchman will not provide a direct answer. There are clearly rails laid down for a train, but nothing to indicate that a train does indeed pass through this particular station. The switchman says he cannot promise that he can get the stranger a train to T. but will help him get a train to anywhere if he can. He does not understand why the stranger insists on going to T.; he notes that it would be a privilege to board any train at all. The stranger argues that he should be able to go to T. since that is the destination marked on his ticket. The switchman tells the stranger that the inn is filled with people who have made that very same assumption, and who may one day actually get there. The switchman explains how the railroad company thinks of their railway system. In their view, their elaborate system, which includes accommodations for years-long trips and even for deaths, is very good.

The switchman then tells a story of certain train rides when the trains arrived at impossible locations. Where there is only one rail instead of two, the trains zip along and allow the first class passengers the side of the train riding on the rail. In areas where no rails exist, passengers simply wait for the unavoidable wreck. In some cases, new towns, like the town of F., were established following the accidents. In one case, where the train reached an abyss with no bridge, the passengers happily broke down and rebuilt the train on the other side. The railroad management was so pleased that they decided to suspend any official bridge building and instead encourage the stripping and recreation of future trains. The stranger still wishes to travel on his train to T. and the switchman, pleased by this, again advises the stranger to get a room at the local inn, but also tells him to avoid the possible riot when the next train to anywhere arrives, which he should attempt to board.

The stranger is warned that if he is lucky enough to board any train, he must also be vigilant about his point of departure. The railroad company occasionally creates false train stations in remote locations to abandon people when the trains become too crowded. On rare occasions, a passenger’s train may actually transport him to where he wants to go. As the stranger is very interested in this, the switchman once again encourages the stranger to try his luck, but warns him not to talk to fellow passengers, who may be spies, and to watch out for mirages that the railroad company generates.

When the stranger asks the switchman how he knows all of this, the switchman replies that he is a retired switchman who visits train stations to reminisce about old times. He has not ever traveled on a train and does not plan on doing so. Suddenly, a train approaches and the switchman begins to signal it. The switchman turns to tell the stranger that he is lucky. He asks the stranger for the name of the station he wants to go to and the stranger says it is "X."

== Reaction ==
Critical reception of Arreola’s short stories in general was largely divided. Though Arreola is considered one of Mexico’s premier historical writers today, his stories did not deal with the usual type of social commentary on Mexican life. Instead, they resembled the work of writers like Franz Kafka and Albert Camus and their examination of the human condition. Though some consider him to be a pioneer in the field on non-realistic literature, critics of him felt that social conditions in Mexico demanded a more realistic examination of the inequalities.

The Switchman was included in the 2008 National Endowment for the Arts Best Read anthology Sun, Stone, and Shadows.

== Literary Analysis ==
Like most of Arreola's stories, The Switchman can be interpreted in a variety of ways—as an allegory of the pitfalls of the Mexican train system, an existential horror story of life's absurdities and human limitation, and the author's desire to laugh in spite of the insanities of the world and human interaction.

On one level the story operates as a satire on the Mexican transportation system, while on another the railroad is an analogy for the hopeless absurdity of the human condition. Its images often go beyond simple satire and more resembles the European theatre of absurdism. In his piece, Arreola focuses on reality as well. He feels that those with authority create absurd laws and conditions in their domain, and their subjects often willingly accept these absurdities, much like ordinary train passengers. In “The Switchman,” the passenger questions the conditions around him. The stranger’s final named destination, X. rather than T., also can have multiple meanings: The stranger could either be already affected by the country’s insanity, attempting to outsmart the system, or to be rewarded for his constant perseverance. In addition, it is not really clear that the system does operate in the way the switchman claims: he may be an insane person or a liar. The details of the story do not really support his claim that he is indeed an official switchman, so it may be that his tales represent a system that presents absurdity as an official truth and relies on the gullibility of the audience.
