= Nancy Stohlman =

American flash fiction writer and musician

- Born: August 13, 1973 (age 53); Washington, D.C., United States
- Occupations: Writer, Singer, Performer
- Years active: 2003–present
- Known for: Going Short: An Invitation to Flash Fiction; Searching for Suzi; Kinky Mink; Flash Fiction
- Website: nancystohlman.com

Nancy Stohlman (born August 13, 1973), is an American flash fiction writer and musician. She is the author of one educational book, two flash novels, one collection of flash fiction, and the editor of four anthologies. Stohlman is also a founding member of Fast Forward Press.

Stohlman's latest books include The Monster Opera (Bartleby Snopes Press, 2013), The Vixen Scream and Other Bible Stories (Pure Slush Press, 2014), and Going Short: An Invitation to Flash Fiction.

She is also a founding member and the lead singer of the lounge metal band, Kinky Mink.

== Background ==
Stohlman was born in Washington D.C. and lived as a child in Virginia, Kansas, Arizona, Germany, Spain, and Nebraska. In Nebraska, she spent two years in the Theater Department at the University of Nebraska–Lincoln. She got her undergraduate degree in Creative Writing from the University of Colorado and her MFA from Naropa University. She has lived in Denver, Colorado since 1995.

In 2007 Stohlman began writing flash fiction and co-founded Fast Forward Press, a press dedicated to publishing flash fiction, where she remained until 2012. She edited three anthologies of flash fiction including Fast Forward: The Mix Tape, the first anthology of flash fiction to ever be a finalist for a Colorado Book Award in 2011.

In 2008 Stohlman coined the term "flash novel" and in 2010 judged the first known flash novel contest for Fast Forward Press. In 2013 she founded the Flashbomb Flash Fiction Reading Series in Denver, which she continues to curate.

In 2021 she won the Reader Views Awards in Arts/Writing & Publishing for her book Going Short: An Invitation to Flash Fiction.

== Performance ==
In 2011 she co-founded the lounge metal band Kinky Mink with pianist Nick Busheff and drummer Scott Ryplewski and in 2012 they released their first full-length album, Kinky Mink. Current members of Kinky Mink include drummer Rory Reagan and guest performers.

In 2013 Stohlman, with the help of Busheff, adapted The Monster Opera for the stage with a full score.

== Publications ==
=== Educational Books ===
- Going Short: An Invitation to Flash Fiction

=== Solo collections of flash fiction ===
- Madam Velvet's Cabaret of Oddities (Big Table Publishing, 2018)
- The Vixen Scream and Other Bible Stories (Pure Slush Press, Nov 2014)

=== Flash Novels ===
- The Monster Opera (Bartleby Snopes Press, 2013)
- Searching for Suzi: A Flash Novel (Monkey Puzzle Press)

=== Anthologies (edited and contributed) ===
- Fast Forward: The Mix Tape (Fast Forward Press, 2010)
- Fast Forward Vol 1 (Fast Forward Press, 2008)
- Fast Forward Vol 2 (Fast Forward Press, 2009)
- Live From Palestine (South End Press, 2003)

=== Anthologies (contributed) ===
- Flash Fiction Funny (Blue Light Press, 2013)
- Flash 101: Surviving the Fiction Apocalypse (Fast Forward Press, 2012)
- What's Nature Got to Do With Me? (Native West Press, 2011)
- The Incredible Shrinking Story (Fast Forward Press, 2011)

=== Albums ===
- Kinky Mink
