= Talehunt =

Mobile application for writing very short stories

TaleHunt App
- Developer: Mocioun Inc.
- Release: January 2016; 10 years ago
- Operating system: iOS, Android
- Type: Social media
- License: Freeware
- Website: talehunt.com

Talehunt was an India-based online community where people could write, read, and post very short stories. It was available as a mobile app (the TaleHunt App) on both Android and iPhone mobile platforms. In TaleHunt, any user can create an account and post stories, fan fiction, and poems, under 250 characters.

The company went offline sometime in 2018 and is no longer operational.

== History ==
TaleHunt was established by Ameen Rashad, Salmon Kollaparamban, and Aby Mathew. The early beta version of Talehunt was available by the end of 2015. The app was officially released in January 2016.

== Design ==
The app has a minimalist design which is simple and is reflected in its logo: a quill and a scribble on a dark green background. The dark green theme is intended to make the TaleHunt App user-friendly and pleasant to read. Once in the app, even before logging in, the user can immediately read other users' short stories and follow the writer if the user liked the tale. Once followed, all stories will show up in the personal timeline, which is customized for each user based on the people he or she follows. Each author also has their own page, which includes their username, profile photo, follow button, number of followers, number of users followed, and a feed of all of the author's stories.

== See also ==
- Flash fiction
