= Juan José Arreola =

Mexican writer, academic, and actor (1918–2001)

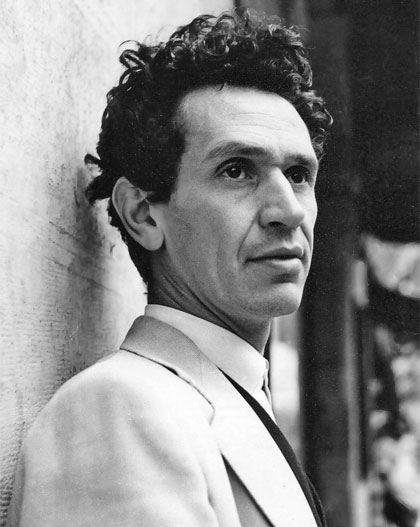
- Arreola as a young man
- Born: Juan José Arreola Zúñiga; 21 September 1918; Zapotlán el Grande (today Ciudad Guzmán), Jalisco, Mexico
- Died: 3 December 2001 (aged 83); Guadalajara, Mexico
- Occupations: Writer; Academic; Actor
- Writing career
- Notable awards: National Prize for Arts and Sciences (1979)

Juan José Arreola Zúñiga (September 21, 1918 – December 3, 2001) was a Mexican writer, academic, and actor. He is considered Mexico's premier experimental short story writer of the 20th century. Arreola is recognized as one of the first Latin American writers to abandon realism; he used elements of fantasy to underscore existentialist and absurdist ideas in his work. Although he is little known outside Mexico, Arreola has served as the literary inspiration for a legion of Mexican writers who have sought to transform their country's realistic literary tradition by introducing elements of magical realism, satire, and allegory. Alongside Jorge Luis Borges, he is considered one of the masters of the hybrid subgenre of the essay-story. Arreola is primarily known for his short stories and he only published one novel, La feria (The Fair; 1963).

== Early life ==
Arreola was born on September 21, 1918, in Zapotlán el Grande (modern-day Ciudad Guzmán), in the state of Jalisco. He was the fourth child out of fourteen of Felipe Arreola Mendoza and Victoria Zúñiga Chávez. In 1930, he began working as a bookbinder, which led to a series of other jobs. On the last day of 1936, Arreola moved to Mexico City after selling his Oliver typewriter and his shotgun to afford the trip. There he entered the Theatrical School of Fine Arts (Escuela Teatral de Bellas Artes).

== Career ==
In 1941, while working as a professor, he published his first work, Sueño de Navidad ("Christmas Dream"). In 1942 he also wrote a short story called Un pacto con el diablo ("A Pact with the Devil"). In 1943, while working as a journalist, he published his second work, Hizo el bien mientras vivió ("He Did Good While He Lived"). In 1945, he collaborated with Juan Rulfo and Antonio Alatorre to publish the literary journal Pan.

Shortly afterward, he traveled to Paris at the invitation of French actor Louis Jouvet. During this time, he became acquainted with other French actors such as Jean-Louis Barrault and Pierre Renoir. A year later he returned to Mexico.

In 1948, he worked as an editor for the main journal published by Fondo de Cultura Económica, and obtained a grant from El Colegio de México. His first collection of short stories, Varia invención, was published in 1949. Around 1950, he began collaborating on the anthology Los presentes and received a grant from the Rockefeller Foundation.

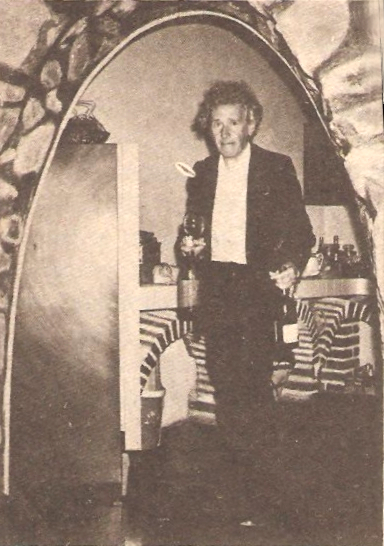
Juan José Arreola holding two bottles of wine

In 1952, Arreola published Confabulario, widely considered to be his first great work. It was awarded the Jalisco Literary Prize in 1953. The following year, Arreola published La hora de todos. The year after that, he published a revised Confabulario and won the Premio del Festival Dramático from the National Institute of Fine Arts. In 1958, he published Punta de plata, and in 1962, Confabulario total. In 1962, he published "The Switchman" (El Guardagujas).

In 1959 he was the founding director of the Casa del Lago, the first off-campus Cultural Center of the National Autonomous University of Mexico, now called the Casa del Lago Juan José Arreola.

In 1963, he received the Xavier Villaurrutia Prize. The same year, he published La feria, a work dense with references to his native Zapotlán El Grande, which would be remembered as one of his finest literary accomplishments. The following year, he edited the anthologies Los Presentes and El Unicornio, and became a professor at the National Autonomous University of Mexico.

In 1967, he appeared in the controversial Alejandro Jodorowsky film Fando y Lis, which after its controversial premiere was banned for a while in Mexico.

In 1969, Arreola was recognized by the José Clemente Orozco Cultural Group of Ciudad Guzmán. In 1971, Confabulario, Palindroma, La feria, and Varia invención were republished as part of a series of his greatest works, Obras de Juan José Arreola. Around 1972, he published Bestiario, a follow-up to 1958's Punta de plata. The following year, he published La palabra educación, and in 1976, Inventario.

== Death ==
Arreola suffered from hydrocephalus, a condition that afflicted him during the last years of his life, and as a result, on December 3, 2001, he died at the age of 83 at his home in Jalisco.

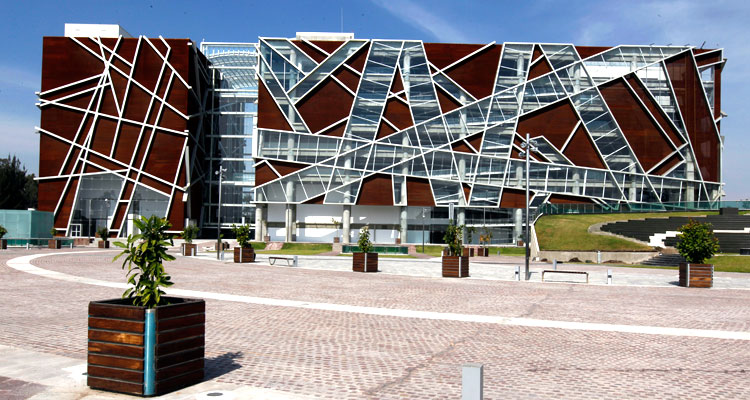
Juan José Arreola Public Library of the State of Jalisco

== Reception and legacy ==
In 1985, the publishing house Hyspamérica commissioned Argentine author Jorge Luis Borges to create a collection of books called Biblioteca personal (English: "Personal Library") in which one of his choices was a selection of Arreola's short stories. Borges wrote in the prologue that if he had to define Arreola in one word it would be "liberty" and, after comparing Arreola's stories to Jonathan Swift and Franz Kafka, he also stated that Arreola was "disdainful of historical, geographical and political circumstances, in an age of suspicious and obstinate nationalism" and instead "fixed his gaze on the universe and its fantastic possibilities."

Despite his relatively small oeuvre, Arreola occupies a fixed place in 20th century Mexican and Latin American literature. Together with Juan Rulfo and Agustín Yañez, he is one of the three great narrators of his state of Jalisco. In his texts, surreal situations often develop, some of them regional, others quite worldly. In Mexico, Arreola has also become known to a wide audience as a literary commentator, especially on television. His merits as a promoter of young talent should not be underestimated.

Writers who achieved literary success in Mexico in the 1950s or 1960s came into contact with Arreola in some form, be it Carlos Fuentes, José Agustín, or José Emilio Pacheco. Arreola's texts have remained significant over the decades.

== Works ==
=== Fiction ===
- Varia invención (short stories, 1949)
- Confabulario (short stories, 1952)
- La feria (only novel, 1963)
- Palíndroma (short stories, 1971)
- Bestiario (short stories, 1972)

=== Non-fiction ===
- La palabra educación (1973)
- Y ahora la mujer (1975)
- Inventario (1976)

=== Anthologies ===
- Confabulario total, 1941–1961 (collects the books Varia invención, Confabulario and Punta de plata, 1962)

=== English-language publications ===
- Confabulario and Other Inventions (Translated by George D. Schade, illustrated by Kelly Fearing, published by University of Texas Press, 1964). From this volume, the short story The Switchman was also published in the anthology Sun, Stone, and Shadows.

== Filmography ==
=== As actor ===
| Year | Film | Role | Notes |
|---|---|---|---|
| 1968 | Fando y Lis | Well-Dressed Man with Book | Cameo; Film was directed by Alejandro Jodorowsky. |
| 1975 | Cayunda | Narrator (voice) | Short film |

== Awards and honors ==
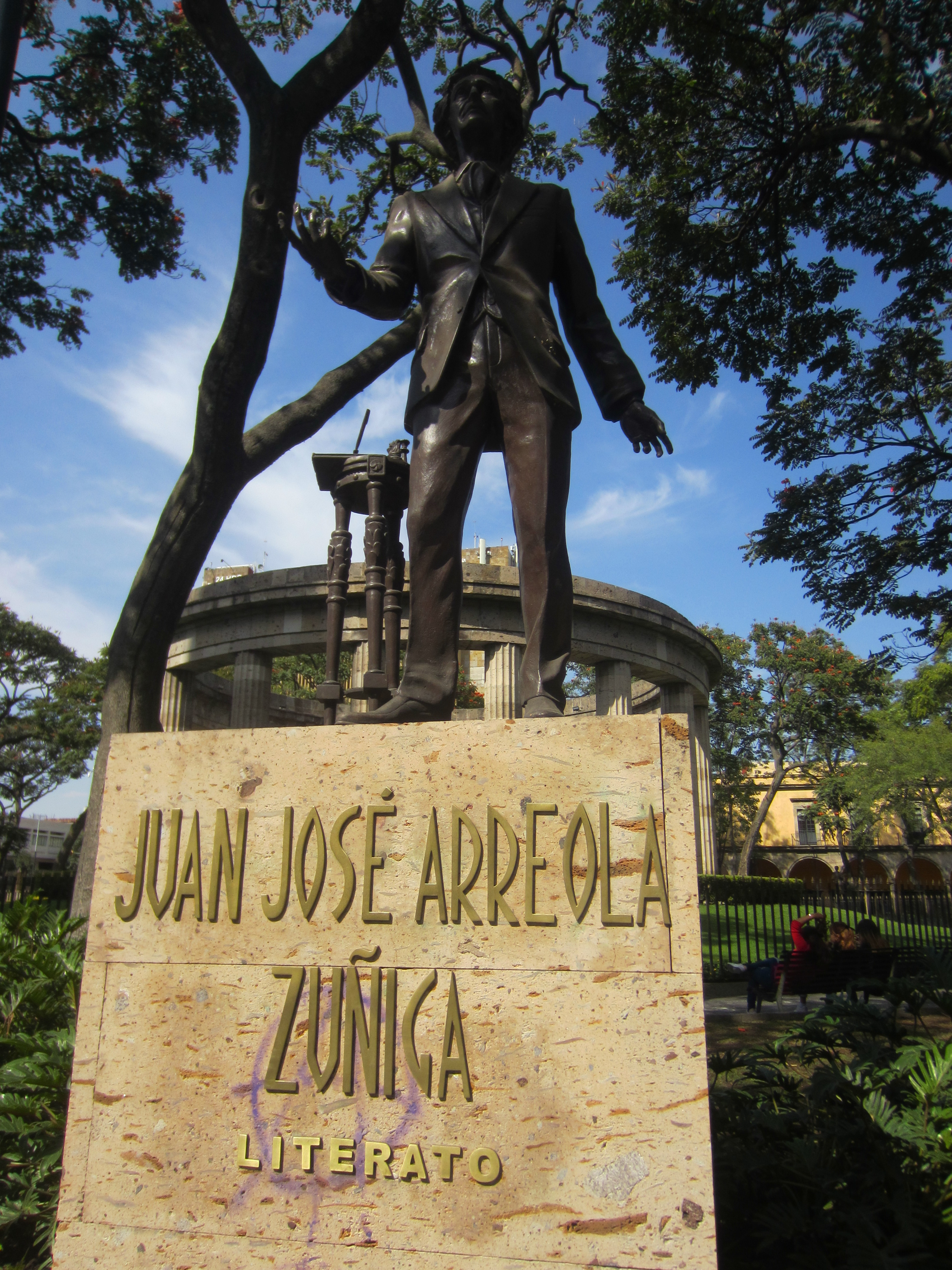
Arreola statue by artist Rubén Orozco, erected in September 2015

Below is a partial list of awards and honors received by Arreola.

=== Awards ===
- Xavier Villaurrutia Award for his novel La feria (1963)
- National Prize for Arts and Sciences in Mexico (Premio Nacional de Ciencias y Artes) for literature and linguistics (1979).
- Jalisco Prize in Letters (1989).
- FIL Award, then known as the "Juan Rulfo Prize" (1992).
- Alfonso Reyes International Prize (1997)
- Ramón López Velarde Prize (1998)

=== Honors ===
- He was named "favorite son" of Guadalajara in 1999.
- In 2015, a statue in honor of Arreola was installed along the Rotonda de los Jaliscienses Ilustres in Guadalajara's city center.

== See also ==
- Jorge Luis Borges
- Juan Rulfo
- Statue of Juan José Arreola
- Francisco Tario
- Julio Cortázar
