= Statue of León Felipe, Mexico City =

Statue in Mexico City, Mexico

Statue of León Felipe
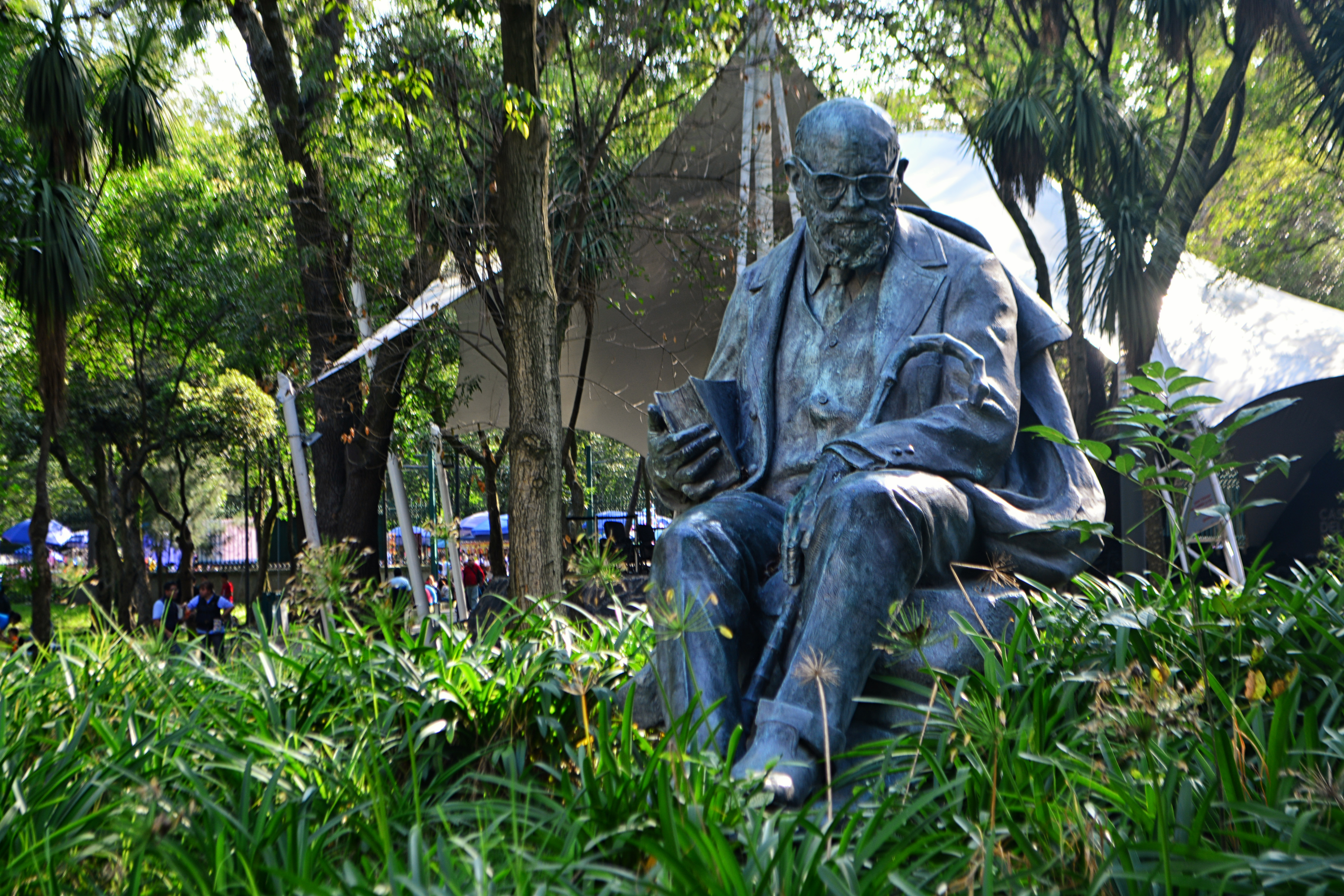
- The statue in 2016
- Subject: León Felipe
- Location: Mexico City, Mexico; 19°25′20.2″N 99°11′10.3″W

The statue of León Felipe is installed in Mexico City's Chapultepec park, in Mexico. The statue was created by Julián Martinez in 1973, and dedicated in 1974.

== See also ==
- 1974 in art
