= Minisaga =

Narrative of exactly fifty words

A minisaga, mini saga or mini-saga is a short story based on a long story. It should contain exactly 50 words, plus a title of up to 15 characters. However, the title requirement is not always enforced and sometimes eliminated altogether. Minisagas are alternately known as microstories, ultra-shorts stories, or fifty-word stories.

The form was invented by writer Brian Aldiss and the newspaper The Daily Telegraph, which has held several minisaga competitions, as has BBC Radio 4.

== Uses ==
Minisagas are used in business, as an educational tool, a creative outlet, and a source of entertainment. They are not poems, but rather "bite-sized lessons for life and business". They are often used to stimulate creativity, stretch one's thinking, determine the essential elements of a story, or enhance discipline in writing. They often attempt to be funny or surprising.

Below is an example by author Daniel H. Pink:

When I was shot, fear seized me at first. No surprise that. But once I realized I wasn't going to die – despite the thermonuclear pain and widening puddle of weirdly warm blood – my mind recalibrated. And one thought, comforting yet disturbing, leapt into my head: I need to Tweet this.

There is a limited publishing market for minisagas, but minisaga contests are sometimes held by various publishers or websites, and a dedicated market for "50-word stories" exists at FiftyWordStories.com, with payments available for each month's strongest story.

== See also ==
- Drabble
- Flash fiction
- Literature
- Short story
