= Erik Moskowitz + Amanda Trager =

Erik Moskowitz + Amanda Trager are an American collaborative artist team working in film, video installation, sound, and other media. Their work has been shown at venues around the world including the Centre Pompidou in Paris; Participant, Inc. in New York; The Showroom in London; Museo Reina Sofia in Spain; and Haus der Kulturen der Welt in Berlin.

== Early lives ==
Moskowitz and Trager were both born and raised in New York City.

Moskowitz's parents are the painters Hermine Ford and Robert Moskowitz, and his grandfather was the painter Jack Tworkov. When he was 8 years old, Moskowitz was selected by Spalding Gray from a pool of public school children, to play a part in The Wooster Group’s Sakonnet Point (1975). He performed in various roles with The Wooster Group until 1982; his relationship with video and performance artist Joan Jonas dates from this period.

== Early work ==
Trager studied painting and drawing at the Art Students League throughout her adolescence. Her first job after studying painting at Antioch College (Yellow Springs, Ohio) was with Telos Press, an academic journal founded in 1968. Its founder and editor Paul Piccone was a friend and mentor until his death in 2003. Trager exhibited painting, sculpture and installation before her collaborative partnership with Moskowitz, which began in 2006.

From 2001 to 2008 Moskowitz produced low-budget syndicated television for E!, Sony Pictures Television, MTV, and CBS. Simultaneously, with Trager, he made video works, which have been presented at the Centre Pompidou, International Film Festival Rotterdam and 303 Gallery, NY, among other venues.

In 2005, Trager appeared in Moskowitz's video, A Bit of Dirt.

== Collaborative work ==
Erik Moskowitz and Amanda Trager began to work together formally in 2006 when invited to the Montalvo Arts Center in Northern California as part of the Lucas Artists Residency Program, where they conceived their first collaboration, Cloud Cuckoo Land (2008). The work takes its title from a failed utopia in Aristophanes' comedy The Birds and tells the story of a couple that leaves the city for an intentional living community. Using a formal device of ventriloquism, which appears in Moskowitz and Trager's other collaborative work, dialogue is dubbed and sung by a "digitally layered 'multi-voice,'" in which "the artists' voices, mixed occasionally with others are collapsed in a single harmony." The work features both Trager and Moskowitz as fictional characters and, later, as themselves in the process of editing the video. The work also features video artist Joan Jonas in the role of town elder.

In 2008, Cloud Cuckoo Land received three grants: a fellowship in Video from the New York Foundation for the Arts (NYFA), a Finishing Funds Award from the Experimental Television Center and a Cuts and Burns Artist Residency from The Outpost. The work has been screened worldwide and was shown as an installation at Momenta Art (Brooklyn) in 2008, 303 gallery (NYC) in 2009, and Haus der Kulturen der Welt (Berlin) in 2010.

Their next video, The Story of Elfranko Wessel (2011), also featured the artists in lead roles, this time in their personae as "artist-couple" and emphasized "the home as opposed to a site of production". It received a Concordia Career Advancement Award from the Concordia Foundation, a grant issued through New York Foundation for the Arts. In 2010, The Outpost awarded the artists a second Cuts and Burns Artist Residency to complete a component for the planned installation. In its first iteration as a single-channel video, it premiered in 2011 at the International Film Festival Rotterdam in the Tiger Awards shorts competition. From there it was presented at IndieLisboa where it won Grand Prize for international short. In 2012, the project was given a Finishing Funds Award from The Arts Council of the Southern Finger Lakes / NYSCA for its most recent iteration as an installation at Studio10, a gallery in Brooklyn.

Their 2013-2014 project, Two Russians in the Free World, is a narrative about "a billionaire who doesn't collect art, and "an artist who no longer makes art." The work "maps the interconnections between artistic inspiration, love, and the marketplace." The narrative also includes Trager and Moskowitz as artists in the process of making the video. The formal device of ventriloquism appears again in this work, suggesting "a group subjectivity but also a subjugated puppet body." The question recurs throughout the work: "why and for whom do artists create?" Two Russians in the Free World - IFFR.COM - International Film Festival Rotterdam 2015 - IFFR

The work was made with the support of a residency granted to the artists at Headlands Center for the Arts in Northern California in late 2011. In 2014, the project received a Finishing Funds Award from The Arts Council of the Southern Finger Lakes / NYSCA for its presentation as an installation at Participant Inc, a non-profit gallery on New York's Lower East Side.

In 2013, the Centre Pompidou’s Hors Pistes film festival featured Cloud Cuckoo Land, The Story of Elfranko Wessel, Two Russians in the Free World, and A Bit of Dirt in a retrospective screening.

== List of works ==
- A Bit of Dirt (2005), directed by Moskowitz, featuring Trager
- Cloud Cuckoo Land (2008)
- Queer Voice (2010)
- The Story of Elfranko Wessels (2011)
- Two Russians in the Free World (2013), short
- Two Russians in the Free World (2014), feature
