= Francisco Tario =

Mexican writer (1911–1977)

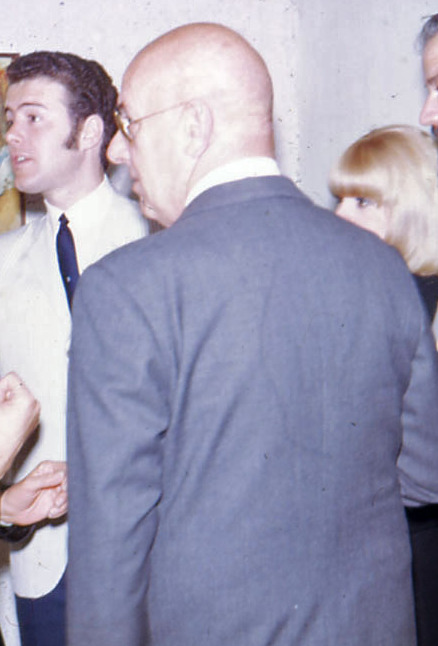
- Tario in May 1969
- Born: Francisco Peláez Vega; 2 December 1911; Mexico City, Mexico
- Died: 30 December 1977 (aged 66); Madrid, Spain
- Occupation: Writer
- Spouse: Carmen Farell (m. 1935; died 1967)
- Children: 2
- Relatives: Antonio Peláez (brother)
- Writing career
- Genres: Fantastic; Grotesque

Signature
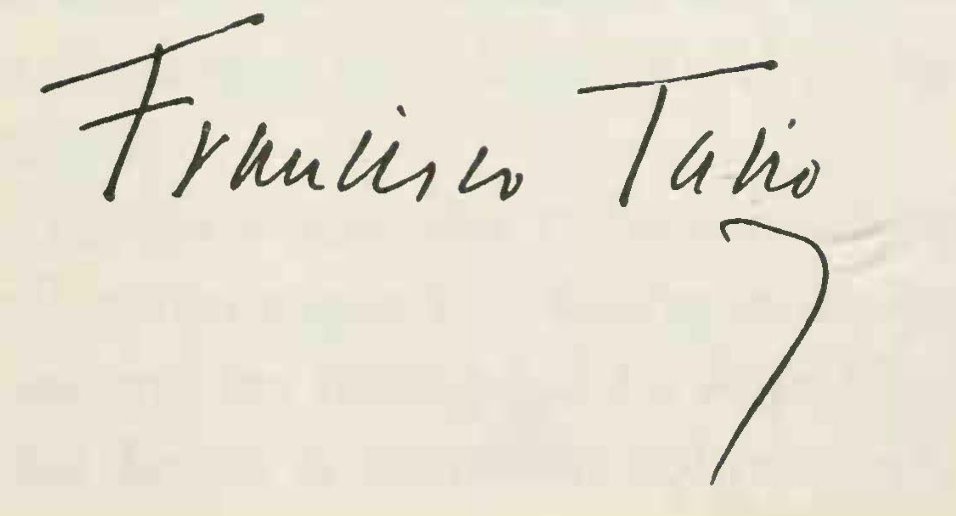

Francisco Peláez Vega (December 2, 1911 - December 30, 1977), known by his pen name Francisco Tario, was a Mexican writer. Tario became a cult writer known for his surrealistic, grotesque and fantastic literature. His work has been compared by critics to the work of Juan José Arreola, Juan Rulfo, and Emil Cioran.

== Life and career ==
=== Life ===
Tario was born Francisco Peláez Vega on December 2, 1911, in Mexico City, the son of immigrants from Asturias. Tario's father was a grocery store owner. His brother was the painter Antonio Peláez.

In 1930, Tario met Carmen Farell and married her in 1935. The couple had two sons, Sergio and Julio.

Besides being a writer, Tario had multiple interests throughout his life: he was a football goalkeeper for the Mexican team Asturias F.C., amateur astronomer, and pianist. He also owned three movie theaters in Acapulco.

=== Career ===
Tario is generally considered a marginal author because he did not form part of any literary movement or join any literary group. He was unknown for many years. He wrote short stories, novels and plays. He has been compared to Juan Rulfo for the personal world he invented for his writings, as well as for the characteristics of his characters, who nevertheless have their own originality. His themes encompass man's sensory limitations in perceiving the vastness of the world around him, but without losing sight of the sense of humour, the appearance of the unusual, the extravagant and the grotesque, which distance him from the traditionalism of other authors, which is why he is considered a precursor of Mexican fantastic narrative in the 1950s.

In most of the stories in his first collection La noche (1943; English: "The Night"), he uses objects and animals to tell the story from their point of view and, when it comes to human beings, they are alienated beings, on the verge of madness or even death, insofar as they are ghosts, who may be unaware that they are ghosts, as in the case of La noche de Margaret Rose (English: "The Night of Margaret Rose").

Tario also published the novel Aquí abajo (1943; English: "Down Here"), the short story collections Tapioca Inn (1952) and Una violeta de más (1968), among others. His novel Jardín secreto (1993; English: "Secret Garden") and the play El caballo asesinado (1968; English: "The Killed Horse") were published posthumously. His complete short stories can be found in Cuentos completos (two volumes, 2003).

In 2011 his son Julio, with the help of the Instituto Nacional de Bellas Artes, distributed free of charge Dos guantes negros (English: "Two Black Gloves"), a booklet containing a poem and two stories dedicated to his sons Sergio and Julio; the texts were found in a baroque and colonial-style chest of drawers belonging to Tario, where he kept some photographic albums, newspaper clippings, recordings and from where the play El caballo asesinado and the novel Jardín secreto were also found.

== Works ==
=== Short story collections ===
- La noche (1943)
- Tapioca Inn (1952)
- Una violeta de más (1968)

=== Novels ===
- Aquí abajo (1943)
- Jardín secreto (1993; posthumous)

=== Plays ===
- El caballo asesinado y otras piezas teatrales (1988; posthumous)

=== Anthologies ===
- La noche del féretro y otros cuentos de la noche (1958)

=== Miscellaneous writings ===
- Equinoccio (1946)
- La puerta en el muro (1946)
- Yo de amores qué sabía (1950)
- Breve diario de un amor perdido (1951)
- Acapulco en el sueño. Con fotografías de Lola Álvarez Bravo (1951)

== See also ==
- Grotesque literature
- Juan Rulfo
- Juan José Arreola
