= Drabble =

Short work of fiction in exactly 100 words

A drabble is a short work of fiction of precisely one hundred words in length. The purpose of the drabble is brevity, testing the author's ability to express interesting and meaningful ideas in a confined space.

== History ==
The concept is said to have originated in UK science fiction fandom in the 1980s; the 100-word format was established by the Birmingham University SF Society, taking a term from Monty Python's 1971 Big Red Book. In the book, "Drabble" was described as a word game where the first participant to write a novel was the winner. In order to make the game possible in the real world, it was agreed that 100 words would suffice. French writer Félix Fénéon may be considered as a precursor with his nouvelles en trois lignes (three-line short stories), inspired by news items.

In drabble contests, participants are given a theme and a certain amount of time to write. (For example, Wilfrid Laurier University conducted a "100 Words Centennial Drabble Contest" in commemoration of its 100th anniversary in 2011, in which contestants were asked to write about "inspiration, leadership or purpose".) Drabble contests, and drabbles in general, are popular in science fiction fandom and in fan fiction. Beccon Publications published three volumes, The Drabble Project (1988) and Drabble II: Double Century (1990), both edited by Rob Meades and David Wake, and Drabble Who (1993), edited by David J. Howe and David Wake.

== Examples ==
Published science fiction writers who have written drabbles include Brian Aldiss and Gene Wolfe (both of whom contributed to The Drabble Project), Lois McMaster Bujold (whose novel Cryoburn finishes with a sequence of five drabbles, each told from the point of view of a different character), and Jake Bible (whose novel Dead Mech was written entirely in drabble format).

100 Word Story is an online literary journal that was co-founded in 2011 by Grant Faulkner and Lynn Mundell. It publishes stories that are exactly 100 words long.

The web has also enabled a rapid spread of the genre, with publishers such as The Third Word Press using the web to collect drabble stories.

== 55 Fiction ==
A similar concept is 55 Fiction, which is a form of microfiction that refers to the works of fiction that are either limited to a maximum of 55 words or have a requirement of exactly 55 words. The origin of 55 Fiction can be traced to a short story writing contest organized by New Times, an independent alternative weekly in San Luis Obispo, California, in 1987. The idea was proposed by New Times founder and publisher Steve Moss.

=== Criteria ===
A literary work will be considered 55 Fiction if it has:

1. 55 words or fewer, however some publishers actually require exactly 55 words – no more and no less;
2. A setting;
3. One or more characters;
4. Some conflict; and
5. A resolution. (Not limited to the moral of the story)

The title of the story is not part of the overall word count, but cannot exceed seven words.

== See also ==
- Flash fiction
- Talehunt
