= Sam Moyer =

American artist

Sam Moyer (born 1983, Chicago, Illinois) is an American artist living and working in Brooklyn, New York. Her work has been positioned alongside that of artists Mika Tajima, R. H. Quaytman, Cheyney Thompson, and Helen Frankenthaler.

== Life and work ==
Moyer received her Bachelor of Fine Arts from the Corcoran College of Art and Design and in 2007 she received her Master of Fine Arts from Yale University.

Her first solo gallery exhibition in 2008, at Cleopatra's gallery in Brooklyn, and it included work that incorporated moving blankets stretched like paintings onto stretcher bars—considering them part of an installation rather than individual paintings or works. Following a residency in Switzerland, the artist's interests shifted to focus on the "poetics of the found object" and she began making book sculptures. This then transitioned into working with fabric, which Moyer distorts by dyeing and bleaching it, as well as stone sourced from local marble yards and warehouses. She considers the stone an expansion of her vocabulary, elements of which are present in her earlier textile works. Moyer's expressionist pieces are said to defy the natural use of the materials she employs and to hold depth in their minimalist flatness that requires reflection in person rather than on the screen. The weight of the stone is said to become deceptively light on the artist's canvases, disrupting the "literal surface [with an] illusory space of uncertain, possibly infinite depth."

== Exhibitions ==
Moyer's work has been included in exhibitions including: tc: temporary contemporary, Bass Museum, Miami Beach, Florida (2014), Thread Lines, The Drawing Center, New York (2014), Material Occupation, University of Albany Art Museum, Albany, New York (2012), Greater New York, MoMA PS1, Queens, New York (2010), Total Recall, Public Art Fund, MetroTech Center, Brooklyn, New York (2010), Between Spaces, MoMA PS1, Queens, New York (2009), If the Dogs are Barking, Artists Space, New York (2009), and Dark Fair, Picture Box Inc., Swiss Institute, New York (2008).

== Art market ==
Moyer has been represented by Sean Kelly Gallery since 2016.

== Publications ==
Sam Moyer: Dyes, PictureBox, Naomi Fry and Sam Moyer, 2013, ISBN 978-0982632734
