= Luis Felipe Lomelí =

Mexican writer & poet (born 1975)

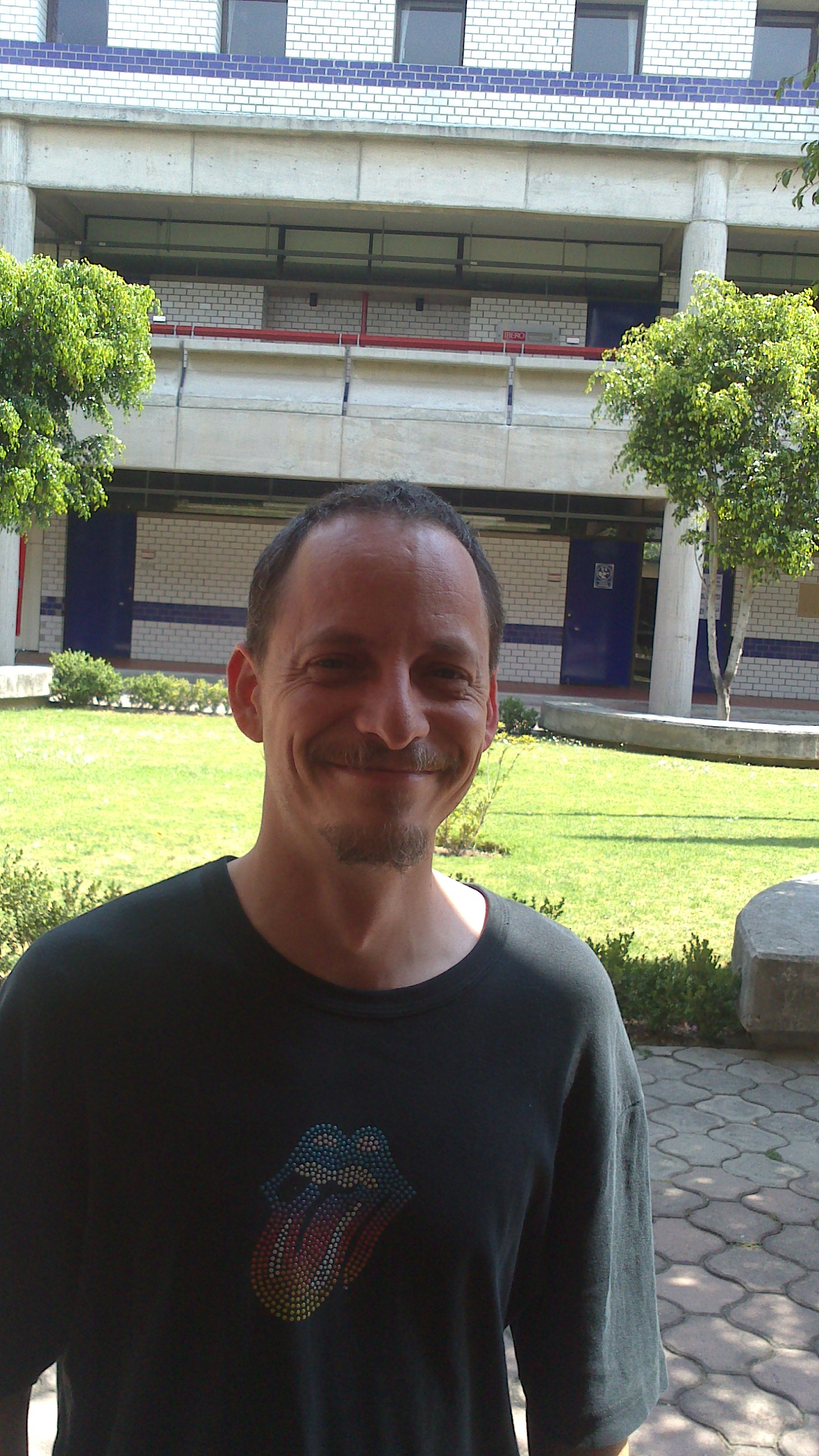
- Born: Luis Felipe Gómez Lomelí; January 10, 1975 (age 51); Etzatlán, Jalisco
- Occupations: Poet, author, engineer
- Writing career
- Notable works: "El emigrante", Todos santos de California

Luis Felipe Gómez Lomelí (January 10, 1975) is a Mexican writer and poet. He is best known for his flash fiction work "El emigrante" (The Migrant – 2005) and for the collection Todos santos de California (All Saints of California – 2002), which won the San Luis Potosí National Award for Best Short Story.

== Biography ==
Luis Felipe Lomelí was born in Guadalajara, Mexico, in 1975. He studied physical engineering, biotechnology and ecology. He gained a Ph.D in Science and Culture at Madrid's Autonomous University. He has worked as an environmental engineer on urban agriculture projects and with eco-feminist groups of women displaced by war in Colombia. He has advised the Spanish Foundation of Science and Technology and has been a judge and evaluator of various competitions and publications for the dissemination of science in a number of Spanish-speaking countries.

Lomelí has lived and published in several countries, and has received scholarships from ITESM, Organization of American States, Monterrey Writers Center, Jalisco State Fund for Culture and the Arts, National Endowment for Culture and Arts, Foundation for Mexican Literature and the National Council for Science and Technology.

Currently, he works at the Iberoamericana University and ITESM on Puebla, Mexico.

== Writing ==
=== Short stories ===
Lomelí has published two collections of short stories. Todos santos de California (All Saints of California – 2002) won the San Luis Potosí National Award for Best Short Story. Ella sigue de viaje (She travels on – 2005) included the story, El cielo de Neuquén (The sky of Neuquén), winner of the Edmundo Valadés Latin American Short Story Prize. His flash fiction work "El emigrante" (The Migrant), the first story in Ella sigue de viaje, may be the shortest story in the Spanish language. His stories have also appeared in several anthologies. One of them: El cuento del cuento (The Story of the Story), in a Spanish-English bilingual edition.

=== Novel ===
Cuaderno de flores (Flower Notebook – 2007) is his first novel. It shows the violence of the guerrillas and drug trafficking in Colombia, and the protagonist's longing in that context to discover freedom and love. The novel, which tells of an engineer torn between the guerillas and the paramilitary and between freedom and safety, draws on the author's experience when staying in Medellín in 2001. Lomelí was supported when writing this novel by the Mexico-Colombia Artistic Residencies program of the Mexican National Fund for Culture and the Arts, the Colombian Ministry of Culture and the Mexican Foundation for Literature.

=== Article writing ===
Lomelí has contributed articles to publications such as the National Autonomous University of Mexico (UNAM) La Jornada, Letras Libres, and Milenio.

In 2011 Lomelí compiled the stories that were published in the third volume of Sólo cuento, a literary project undertaken by the UNAM Directorate of Arts. He made a personal choice that included stories from well-known authors and also from young and relatively unknown writers.

== Awards and accolades ==
- Vice Versa National Short Story Award, 2000
- San Luis Potosí National Award for best Short Story, 2001, for his collection of short stories Todos santos de California.
- Mexican Foundation for Literature fellowship, 2003–2004.
- National Fund for Culture and the Arts fellowship, 2002–2003 and 2009–2010
- Primero Edmundo Valadés Grant for Best Latin American Short Story, 2004 for the story El Cielo de Neuquén, which was included in Ella sigue de viaje.
- San Luis Potosí National Short Story Prize for his collection Todos santos de California (All Saints of California).

== Bibliography ==
- G. Lomelí, Luis Felipe (June 2002). Todos santos de California. Spanish Pubs Llc. ISBN 978-970-699-068-6.
- Gómez Lomelí, Luis Felipe (2004). "Sofía Kovalevskaya: mujer nihilista" (PDF). Ingeneierías. VII (23–24).
- G. Lomelí, Luis Felipe (2005). Ella sigue de viaje. Tusquets. ISBN 978-970-699-105-8.
- Gómez Lomelí, Luis Felipe (2006). "Relaciones Ciencia y Sociedad: Los Ecologistas y Los Bárbaros". El pensamiento científico en la sociedad actual. Ministerio de Educación. ISBN 978-84-369-4360-3.
- G. Lomelí, Luis Felipe (2007). Cuaderno de flores. Tusquets. ISBN 978-970-699-163-8.
- Gómez Lomelí, Luis Felipe (2007-10-16), Naturaleza coerción vs. conseso, doctoral thesis, Universidad Autónoma de Madrid. Departamento de Lingüística, Lógica, e Historia y Filosofía de la Ciencia, archived from the original on 2016-03-03
- Gómez Lomelí, Luis Felipe (2009). El ambientalismo. Nostra. ISBN 978-607-7603-23-8.
- Luis Felipe Lomelí, ed. (2011). Sólo cuento. Universidad Nacional Autónoma de México. ISBN 978-607-02-2378-5.
- Lomelí, Luis Felipe (2014). Indio borrado. Tusquets. ISBN 9786074216011.
