= Flash fiction =

Style of fictional literature or fiction of extreme brevity

Flash fiction is a fiction narrative in the form of a very short piece of writing, which still offers a character arc or implies a larger story. Some commentators believe flash fiction possesses a unique literary quality in its ability to hint at that larger story. It is briefer even than the traditional format of the short story.

Varieties are sometimes defined by word count, including the six-word story, the 280-character story ("twitterature"), the "dribble" (also known as the "minisaga", 50 words), and the "drabble" (also known as "microfiction", 100 words). The usual upper limit for flash fiction is 1000 words.

== History ==
Flash fiction has roots going back to prehistory, recorded at origin of writing, including fables and parables, notably Aesop's Fables and the Parables of Jesus in the west, and Panchatantra and Jataka tales in India. Later examples include the tales of Nasreddin, and Zen koans such as The Gateless Gate.

In the United States, early forms of flash fiction can be found in the 19th century, notably in the figures of Walt Whitman, Ambrose Bierce, and Kate Chopin.

In the 1920s, flash fiction was referred to as the "short short story" and was associated with Cosmopolitan magazine, and in the 1930s, collected in anthologies such as The American Short Short Story.

Somerset Maugham was a notable proponent, with his Cosmopolitans: Very Short Stories (1936) being an early collection.

In Japan, flash fiction was popularized in the post-war period particularly by Michio Tsuzuki (都筑道夫).

In 1986, Jerome Stern at the Florida State University organized the World's Best Short-Short Story Contest for stories of fewer than 250 words. Michael Martone, the first winner, received $100 and a crate of Florida oranges as the prize. The Southeast Review continues the contest but has increased the maximum to 500 words. In 1996, Stern published Micro Fiction: an anthology of really short stories drawn, in part, from the contest.

It was not until 1992, however, that the term "flash fiction" came into use as a category/genre of fiction. It was coined by James Thomas, who together with Denise Thomas and Tom Hazuka edited the 1992 landmark anthology titled Flash Fiction: 72 Very Short Stories, and was introduced by Thomas in his Introduction to that volume. Since then the term has gained wide acceptance as a form, especially in the W. W. Norton Anthologies co-edited by Thomas: Flash Fiction America, Flash Fiction International, Flash Fiction Forward, and Flash Fiction: 72 Very Short Stories. In the late 20th and early 21st centuries, several writers became associated with contemporary flash fiction. Lydia Davis and Diane Williams have been widely discussed for their very short, formally experimental prose. The growing recognition of the form was reflected in initiatives such as Rose Metal Press’s inaugural short-short chapbook contest in the early 2000s, which published Claudia Smith’s The Sky Is a Well and Other Shorts. Other writers associated with the form include Kim Chinquee and Kathy Fish. In 2020, the Harry Ransom Center at the University of Texas at Austin established the first curated collection of flash fiction artifacts in the United States.

== Authors ==
Practitioners have included Saadi of Shiraz ("Gulistan of Sa'di"), Bolesław Prus, Anton Chekhov, O. Henry, Franz Kafka, H. P. Lovecraft, Yasunari Kawabata, Ernest Hemingway, Julio Cortázar, Daniil Kharms, Arthur C. Clarke, Richard Brautigan, Ray Bradbury, Kurt Vonnegut Jr., Fredric Brown, John Cage, Philip K. Dick, and Robert Sheckley.

Hemingway also wrote 18 pieces of flash fiction that were included in his first short-story collection, In Our Time (1925). While it is often alleged that (to win a bet) he also wrote the flash fiction "For Sale, Baby Shoes, Never Worn", various iterations of the story date back to 1906, when Hemingway was only seven years old, rendering his authorship implausible.

Also notable are the 62 "short-shorts" which comprise Severance, the thematic collection by Robert Olen Butler in which each story describes the remaining 90 seconds of conscious awareness within human heads which have been decapitated.

Contemporary English-speaking writers well known for their published flash fiction include Amy Hempel, George Saunders, Jamaica Kincaid, Lydia Davis, David Gaffney, Robert Scotellaro, Kathy Fish, Nancy Stohlman, Sherrie Flick, Bruce Holland Rogers, Steve Almond, Barbara Henning, and Grant Faulkner.

Spanish-speaking literature has many authors of microstories, including Augusto Monterroso ("El Dinosaurio") and Luis Felipe Lomelí ("El Emigrante"). Their microstories are some of the shortest ever written in that language. In Spain, authors of microrrelatos (very short fictions) have included Andrés Neuman, Ramón Gómez de la Serna, José Jiménez Lozano, Javier Tomeo, José María Merino, Juan José Millás, and Óscar Esquivias. In his collection La mitad del diablo (Páginas de Espuma, 2006), Juan Pedro Aparicio included the one-word story Luis XIV, which in its entirety reads: "Yo" ("I"). In Argentina, notable contemporary contributors to the genre have included Marco Denevi, Luisa Valenzuela, and Ana María Shua.

The Italian writer Italo Calvino consciously searched for a short narrative form, drawing inspiration from Argentine writers Jorge Luis Borges and Adolfo Bioy Casares and finding that Monterroso's was "the most perfect he could find"; "El dinosaurio", in turn, possibly inspired his "The Dinosaurs".

German-language authors of Kürzestgeschichten, influenced by brief narratives penned by Bertolt Brecht and Franz Kafka, have included Peter Bichsel, Heimito von Doderer, Günter Kunert, and Helmut Heißenbüttel.

The Arabic-speaking world has produced a number of microstory authors, including the Nobel Prize-winning Egyptian author Naguib Mahfouz, whose book Echoes of an Autobiography is composed mainly of such stories. Other flash fiction writers in Arabic include Zakaria Tamer, Haidar Haidar, and Laila al-Othman.

Francophone literature includes micronouvelles (microfiction) which emerged as a recognized form from the 2000s onward, particularly in France and Quebec. Writers such as Jacques Fuentealba, Olivier Gechter and Laurent Berthiaume are among its contemporary practitioners.

In the Russian-speaking world, Linor Goralik is a notable flash fiction writer.

In the southwestern Indian state of Kerala, P. K. Parakkadavu is known for his many microstories in the Malayalam language.

Hungarian writer István Örkény is known (beside other works) for his One-Minute Stories.

== Journals ==
=== Print ===
A number of print journals dedicate themselves to flash fiction. These include Flash: The International Short-Short Story Magazine.

=== Online ===
Access to the Internet has enhanced an awareness of flash fiction, with online journals being devoted entirely to the style. In a 2018 article published in The Paris Review, the author attributes the "emerging popularity of the [flash fiction] form" to "the rise of online journals, such as wigleaf or SmokeLong Quarterly, and the online sections of print journals, like Tin House’s Flash Friday feature[.]"

In a CNN article on the subject, the author remarked that the "democratization of communication offered by the Internet has made positive in-roads" in the specific area of flash fiction, and directly influenced the style's popularity. The form is popular, with most online literary journals now publishing flash fiction.

In summer 2017, The New Yorker began running a series of flash fiction stories online every summer.

== See also ==
- Every Day Fiction
- Fable
- Minisaga
- Parable
- Prose poetry
- Short story
- Talehunt
