= Goat (disambiguation) =

A goat is a mammal.

Goat, goat, or GOAT may also refer to:

== Animals ==
- Capra (genus) or wild goats, a genus of species including goats, ibexes, and others
- Mountain goat, Oreamnos americanus, a North American animal commonly but not expertly considered to be a wild goat
- Wild goat, Capra aegagrus, the species from which the domestic goat was bred
- Pronghorn, Antilocapra americana, a North American animal sometimes colloquially called "speed goat", despite not being closely related to true goats

== Places ==
- Goat Fell, Isle of Arran, Scotland
- Goat Buttes, California, US
- Goat Lake (Glacier County, Montana)
- Goat Lake (Sawtooth Wilderness), a glacial lake in Custer County, Idaho
- Goat Creek (disambiguation)
- Goat River (disambiguation)
- Goat Island (disambiguation)
- Goat Mountain (disambiguation)

== Arts, media, and entertainment ==
=== Films ===
- Goat (2015 film), a Slovak drama that was a submission for the Academy Award for Best Foreign Language Film
- Goat (2016 film), an American drama centered on college fraternity pledging and hazing
- Goat (2026 film), an American animated sports comedy featuring an anthropomorphic goat aspiring to be "greatest of all time"
- Goats (film), a 2012 comedy starring David Duchovny and Vera Farmiga
- The Goat (1917 film), a comedy starring Oliver Hardy
- The Goat (1918 film), a comedy starring Fred Stone
- The Goat (1921 film), a comedy starring Buster Keaton

=== Literature ===
- Goats (novel), 2000, by Mark Jude Poirier
- Goats (webcomic), by Jonathan Rosenberg
- The Goat, or Who Is Sylvia?, a 2002 play by Edward Albee

=== Music ===
==== Groups ====
- Goat (Japanese band), an experimental band
- Goat (Swedish band), an alternative and experimental fusion group
- The Goats, an American hip-hop trio 1991–1994

==== Albums ====
- Goat (album), by the Jesus Lizard, 1991
- G.O.A.T. (Diljit Dosanjh album), or the title song, 2020
- G.O.A.T. (LL Cool J album), or the title song, 2000
- GOAT, an EP by Number_i, or the title song, 2024
- The Goat (album), by Polo G, 2020
- The Goat, by Inkubus Sukkubus, 2011
- G.O.A.T, by Conway the Machine and Daringer

==== Songs ====
- "Goat" (song), by Lil Tjay, 2018
- "Goat", by Man Man from Dream Hunting in the Valley of the In-Between, 2020
- "G.O.A.T", by Kasabian, featuring Cristale, the opening theme of the TV programme Super Sunday, 2025
- "G.O.A.T", by the Notorious B.I.G., 2022
- "G.O.A.T", by Theory of a Deadman from Wake Up Call, 2017
- "The Goat" / "The Bells Have Stopped Ringing", by Sopor Aeternus and The Ensemble of Shadows, 2005

=== Other uses in arts, media, and entertainment ===
- The GOAT (TV series), 2024
- CKLM-FM, a radio station branded as "106.1 The Goat"
- WXYG, a radio station branded as "Album Rock 540, The Goat"
- "The Goat" (How I Met Your Mother), a 2008 episode of the American television sitcom
- GOATS, a team composition for the video game Overwatch centered on the playable character Brigitte
- The GOAT, a season of The Joe Schmo Show

== Sports ==
- GOAT (sports culture), an abbreviation for "Greatest of All Time" used in sports commentary
- GOAT Racing, a Spanish motor racing team
- Goating, a strategy in roller derby

== Vehicles ==
- Goat, a South Devon Railway 0-4-0 Owl class steam locomotive
- Gama Goat, a small articulated cargo vehicle used by the U.S. Army
- Pontiac GTO, an American muscle car
- Sandlin Goat, a glider

== Other uses ==
- Goat (zodiac), a sign in the Chinese zodiac
- Goat (musician), the stage name for American singer Andy Rosen
- The Goat, Kensington, a pub in London
- Galveston Orientation and Amnesia Test, a neurological test
- Government of All the Talents, or the Ministry of All the Talents, an 1806 British ministry
- The goat, the last in their class at the United States Military Academy

== See also ==
- GAT (disambiguation)
- GOT (disambiguation)
- GATT (disambiguation)
- Gott (disambiguation)
- Greatest of All Time (disambiguation), commonly abbreviated as GOAT
