= Greatest of All Time =

Greatest of All Time may refer to:

- GOAT (sports culture), athletes considered the best in their particular sport
- Goat (2026 film), animated sports comedy film featuring an anthropomorphic goat aspiring to be "greatest of all time"
- The Greatest of All Time, a 2024 Indian film starring Vijay
  - The Greatest of All Time (soundtrack), the film's soundtrack
- "Greatest of All Time", a song from the 1995 Archers of Loaf album Vee Vee
- Jeopardy! The Greatest of All Time, an American game show tournament

== See also ==
- G.O.A.T. (disambiguation)
