= Cannabigerol =

Minor cannabinoid

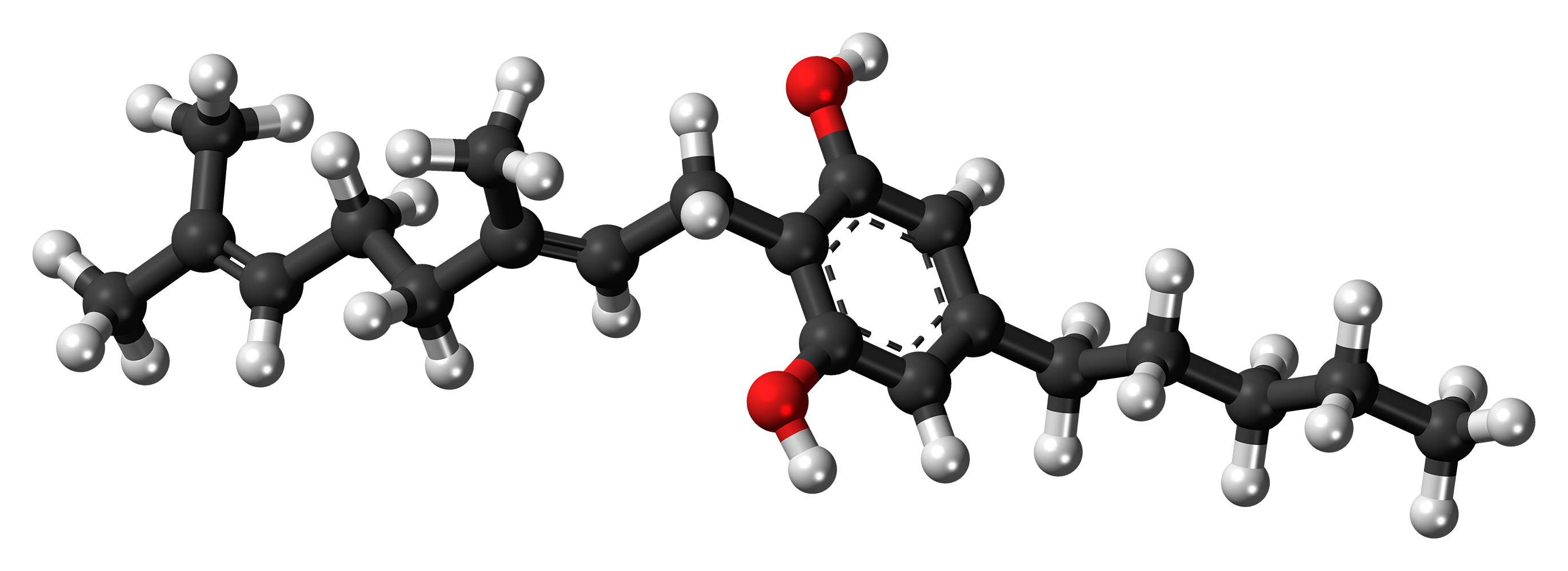

Clinical data
- Other names: CBG
- ATC code: None

Legal status
- Legal status: US: Unscheduled

Identifiers
- IUPAC name: 2-[(2E)-3,7-Dimethylocta-2,6-dienyl]-5-pentyl-benzene-1,3-diol
- CAS Number: 25654-31-3
- PubChem CID: 5315659
- IUPHAR/BPS: 11094
- DrugBank: DB14734
- ChemSpider: 4474921
- UNII: J1K406072N
- KEGG: C20219
- ChEBI: CHEBI:69477
- ChEMBL: ChEMBL497318
- CompTox Dashboard (EPA): DTXSID701014168
- ECHA InfoCard: 100.346.098

Chemical and physical data
- Formula: C_{21}H_{32}O_{2}
- Molar mass: 316.485 g·mol^{−1}
- 3D model (JSmol): Interactive image
- SMILES: Oc1cc(cc(O)c1C/C=C(\C)CC\C=C(/C)C)CCCCC
- InChI: InChI=1S/C21H32O2/c1-5-6-7-11-18-14-20(22)19(21(23)15-18)13-12-17(4)10-8-9-16(2)3/h9,12,14-15,22-23H,5-8,10-11,13H2,1-4H3/b17-12+; Key:QXACEHWTBCFNSA-SFQUDFHCSA-N

Cannabigerol (CBG) is a cannabinoid and minor constituent of cannabis. It is one of more than 120 identified cannabinoids found in the plant genus Cannabis. The compound is the decarboxylated form of cannabigerolic acid (CBGA), the parent molecule from which other cannabinoids are biosynthesized. That's why it is known as the mother of all cannabinoids.

During plant growth, most of the CBG is converted into other cannabinoids, primarily tetrahydrocannabinol (THC) or cannabidiol (CBD), leaving about 1% CBG in finished plant material. Some strains, however, produce larger amounts of CBG and CBGA, while having low quantities of other cannabinoids, such as THC and CBD.

The pharmacodynamics of CBG are complex. It is a relatively weak ligand of the cannabinoid receptors, where it acts as a weak partial agonist. Conversely, it is a much more potent agonist of the α_{2}-adrenergic receptor, antagonist of the serotonin 5-HT_{1A} receptor, and antagonist of the transient receptor potential channel TRPM8. CBG also has a variety of other actions that may additionally contribute to its effects.

CBG is sold as a dietary supplement. Safety concerns have been raised by the FDA due to the potent activation of α_{2}-adrenergic receptors by CBG, which may produce sedation and potentially undesirable cardiovascular effects such as decreased heart rate and blood pressure.

== Pharmacology ==
=== Pharmacodynamics ===
In vitro, CBG has identified pharmacodynamic actions and its mechanism of action appears to be from interactions with multiple targets.

CBG is a weak ligand of the cannabinoid CB_{1} and CB_{2} receptors with affinities (K_{i}) of 380–2,600 nM and 153–3,460 nM, respectively. It is a weak partial agonist or antagonist of both of these receptors. There is no information on the binding or activity of CBG at the GPR55 (the potential non-homologous CB_{3} receptor). CBG has relatively low affinity for the cannabinoid receptors, with approximately 5-fold lower affinity for the CB_{1} receptor and 27-fold lower affinity for the CB_{2} receptor than THC.

CBG is a highly potent agonist of the α_{2}-adrenergic receptor (EC_{50} = 0.2–72.8 nM) and a moderately potent antagonist of the serotonin 5-HT_{1A} receptor (K_{B} = 51.9 nM). Activation of the α_{2}-adrenergic receptor by CBG might produce effects including sedation, dry mouth, and decreased heart rate and blood pressure. This has raised safety concerns about CBG. The actions of CBG at the α_{2}-adrenergic receptor and 5-HT_{1A} receptor are of far greater potency than its interactions with the cannabinoid receptors and are more likely to be involved in its pharmacodynamic effects.

The compound is a weak agonist of the transient receptor potential channels TRPA1 (EC_{50} = 700 nM), TRPV1 (EC_{50} = 1,300 nM), TRPV2 (EC_{50} = 1,720 nM), TRPV3 (EC_{50} = 1,000 nM), and TRPV4 (EC_{50} = 5,100 nM) (efficacy 18–100% at these targets) and a more potent antagonist of the transient receptor potential channel TRPM8 (IC_{50} = 160 nM). It is also a weak agonist of the peroxisome proliferator-activated receptor PPAR-γ (EC_{50} = 1,270–15,700 nM).

CBG is a voltage-gated sodium channel (VGSC) blocker (Na_{v}1.1, Na_{v}1.2, Na_{v}1.5, and Na_{v}1.7) and voltage-dependent calcium channel (VDCC) blocker. Inhibition of VGSCs may be involved in the analgesic effects of CBG.

It shows no inhibition of several endocannabinoid-metabolizing enzymes including fatty acid amide hydrolase (FAAH), diacylglycerol lipase (DGL), and N-acylethanolamine acid amide hydrolase (NAAA). However, other research has found that CBG does inhibit FAAH and DGL, as well as monoacylglycerol lipase (MAGL), although it is less potent as an inhibitor of FAAH than cannabidiol (CBD). Aside from endocannabinoid-metabolizing enzymes, CBG is a weak inhibitor of the cyclooxygenase COX-1 and COX-2 enzymes (30% inhibition of each at 25,000 nM). In addition, it has been found to inhibit both the metabolism and reuptake of anandamide.

=== Pharmacokinetics ===
The pharmacokinetics of CBG have been studied in animals and to a lesser extent in humans. CBG is metabolized in the liver by CYP2J2, similarly to other cannabinoids as well as endocannabinoids.

== Chemistry ==
CBG is a highly lipophilic and hydrophobic compound. Its predicted log P ranges from 7.0 to 7.5.

Synthetic derivatives of CBG have been synthesized and studied.

== History ==
CBG was isolated from cannabis in 1964.

== Society and culture ==
=== Legal status ===
CBG is not scheduled by the United Nations Convention on Psychotropic Substances. In the United States, CBG derived from marijuana is illegal under the Controlled Substances Act, while CBG derived from hemp is legal, as long as the hemp THC content is less than 0.3% of dry weight.

In Switzerland, it is legal to produce hemp rich in CBG as a tobacco substitute, as long as its THC content remains below 1.0%.

=== Regulation ===
As of 2022, the US Food and Drug Administration has issued numerous warning letters to American companies for illegally marketing cannabis supplement products, including one selling CBG products with unproven illegal claims of efficacy against the COVID-19 virus and inflammation.

== Biosynthesis ==
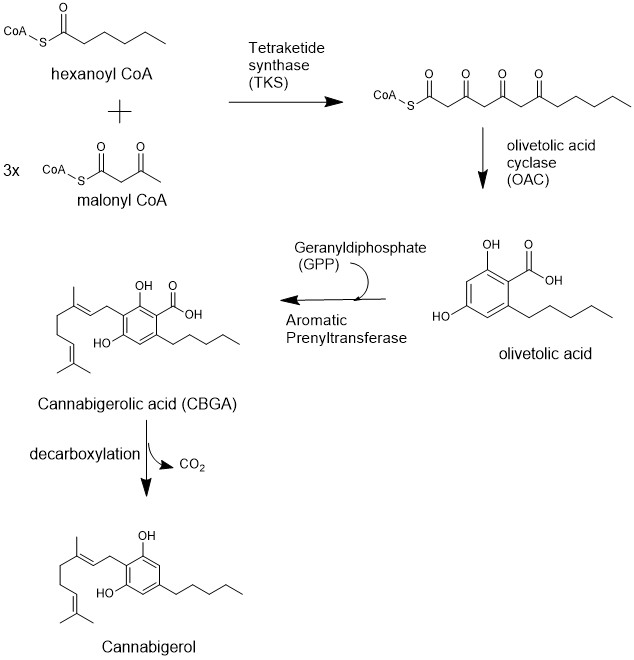
Biosynthesis of CBG.

The biosynthesis of CBG begins by loading hexanoyl-CoA onto a polyketide synthase assembly protein and subsequent condensation with three molecules of malonyl-CoA. This polyketide is cyclized to olivetolic acid via olivetolic acid cyclase, and then prenylated with a ten carbon isoprenoid precursor, geranyl pyrophosphate, using an aromatic prenyltransferase enzyme, geranyl-pyrophosphate—olivetolic acid geranyltransferase, to biosynthesize cannabigerolic acid, which can then be decarboxylated to yield CBG.

== Research ==
CBG is under laboratory research to determine its pharmacological properties and potential effects in disease conditions, with no conclusions about therapeutic effects or safety, as of 2021. A clinical trial published in July 2024 assessed the effects of CBG on anxiety, stress, and mood. CBG has been determined to have antimicrobial properties in both in vivo and in vitro models. The clinical development has, however, been hindered by its poor drug metabolism and pharmacokinetic properties.
