= Gott's =

Gott's may refer to:

- Gott's Park or Armley Park, park in Leeds, West Yorkshire, Northern England
- Gott's Roadside, Northern California restaurant group

== See also ==
- Gott (disambiguation)
