= Hateship, Friendship, Courtship, Loveship, Marriage =

2001 book of short stories by Alice Munro

- First edition
- Author: Alice Munro
- Language: English
- Genre: Short story collection
- Publisher: McClelland & Stewart
- Publication date: 2001
- Publication place: Canada
- Pages: 322 pages
- ISBN: 0771065256
- OCLC: 798635005

Hateship, Friendship, Courtship, Loveship, Marriage is a book of short stories by Alice Munro, published by McClelland and Stewart in 2001.

In 2006, the story "The Bear Came over the Mountain" was adapted into a film, Away from Her, directed by Sarah Polley and produced by Atom Egoyan. Following the release of this film, the collection was republished under the title Away from Her.

Hateship, Loveship, a 2014 film adaptation of the title story, stars Kristen Wiig, Guy Pearce, Hailee Steinfeld and Nick Nolte.

== Stories ==
- "Hateship, Friendship, Courtship, Loveship, Marriage": In southwestern Ontario, Canada, Johanna, a plain, poor, unmarried woman, works as a housekeeper for Mr. McCauley and his granddaughter Sabitha. Sabitha's mother is dead, and her father, Ken Boudreau, lives elsewhere in poverty, frequently pleading with his father-in-law for money. Sabitha is friends with Edith, a shoe repairman's daughter who feels bored with her constricting blue-collar lifestyle. Edith devises a hoax in which she and Sabitha forge love letters from Sabitha's father to Johanna. Johanna, convinced by the letters that Ken will marry her, uses her substantial savings to travel to his remote location in rural Canada. She discovers that Ken has fallen ill, and, lovingly, she nurses him back to health. Having realized that Ken cannot control his own life, Johanna takes charge and arranges for them to start a new life. Ken, impressed by Johanna's resolve and by her savings, does not question her decisions. Several years later, Edith learns that Ken and Johanna have married and had a child. She is confused by the consequences of her hoax, but soon focuses once more on her desire to escape her parents' lifestyle and show everyone who she really is.
- "Floating Bridge": Jinny, a middle-aged woman with cancer, travels with her husband Neal from a medical appointment. She has received startling news, but her husband does not appear concerned. Instead, Neal flirts with Helen, the young woman whom they have hired to help around the house while Jinny undergoes chemotherapy. He insists that they pick up Helen's shoes from the home of her foster parents even though Jinny wants to return home immediately. Jinny refuses to leave the car when they arrive at the foster parents' trailer home, but Neal decides to join them for a meal. She thinks over what she learned from the doctor: her cancer, which she had assumed to be fatal, is receding. Eventually, the foster parents' teenage son Ricky approaches Jinny in the car. Jinny allows him to drive her away into the fields, where they kiss on a floating bridge. This small act of retaliation against Neal rejuvenates Jinny, who now feels able to face the possibility of her survival.
- "Family Furnishings": The narrator reminisces about Alfrida, her father's nonconformist cousin who worked as an advice columnist in the city. Alfrida seems urbane and sophisticated to the young narrator, who views her with admiration. Once the narrator attends college, however, she distances herself from Alfrida and avoids her frequent dinner invitations. The narrator's only visit to Alfrida is marked by the narrator's condescension toward Alfrida's poverty and lack of cultivation. The dinner, however, does make one lasting impression. Alfrida recalls how her mother died of severe burns caused by an exploding lamp. She had wanted to see her mother but was denied by relatives; Alfrida responded by saying that her mother would have wanted to see her if their places were reversed. Later in life, the narrator transforms this incident into a short story that offends the elderly Alfrida. She receives no more information about Alfrida until Alfrida's illegitimate daughter appears at the funeral of the narrator's father. The daughter tells the narrator that Alfrida grudgingly admired the narrator's writing, although Alfrida thought that the narrator wasn't as smart as she thought she was. This revelation causes the narrator to return to the evening of her last dinner with her father's cousin. Afterward she had gone to a coffee shop where, drinking the coffee and watching the middle-class men and women around her, the narrator had thought that this was what she truly wanted out of life.
- "Comfort": Nina returns home to discover that her husband Lewis, a retired science teacher, has committed suicide. He had developed a neurological disorder, and he and Nina had planned the suicide to avoid unnecessary suffering. Nina, however, did not expect him to die while she was away, and unsuccessfully searches the room for a suicide note. She notifies medical authorities, but eliminates any evidence of suicide. Lewis, an aggressive atheist, had been forced to resign for refusing to teach creationism, and he did not want his enemies to think he killed himself as a result. Nina entrusts the funeral arrangements to Ed, a local undertaker whom she once kissed at a party. While embalming the body, Ed discovers a small note in Lewis's pocket that he gives to Nina. Instead of the expected farewell, it contains satirical verse that ridicules Lewis's creationist adversaries. Nina spreads Lewis's ashes outside of town, where she experiences a sense of newfound comfort as she rids herself of her deceased husband's remains.
- "Nettles"
- "Post and Beam"
- "What is Remembered"
- "Queenie"
- "The Bear Came Over the Mountain": Grant, a retired university professor, and his wife, Fiona, have been together for decades. Their marriage has been mostly happy, although Grant had frequent affairs. But Fiona develops Alzheimer's disease, forcing Grant to commit her to a nursing home. After a thirty-day waiting period, Grant visits Fiona and discovers that she has forgotten him and initiated a relationship with another patient, Aubrey. He wonders whether this affair might not be revenge for his former affairs, but Grant accepts it as unavoidable. Eventually, however, Aubrey's wife Marian withdraws Aubrey from the home. Fiona's condition quickly deteriorates, and Grant confronts Marian, pleading with her to let Aubrey see Fiona. Marian refuses, citing the difficulty of handling Aubrey and her own scant financial resources; Grant also perceives that Marian feels alone without her husband. Disappointed, Grant returns home, but finds that Marian has since invited him to a singles' dance. He realizes that a relationship with Marian will enable him to reunite Aubrey and Fiona, and he accepts. Grant soon visits Fiona to inform her that Aubrey will see her again. Fiona, however, has briefly recovered her memory and recognizes her husband. She says that he could have just forsaken her, to which he responds, "Not a chance."

== Prior publications ==
"The Bear Came Over the Mountain" was originally published on its own in The New Yorker on 27 December 1999, where it was republished on 21 October 2013. "Queenie" was originally published on its own in London Review of Books on 30 July 1998.

== Reception ==
In his review for the New York Times, William H. Pritchard drew connections between Munro's work in this collection to fellow North American authors, Eudora Welty and Flannery O' Connor, while maintaining his praise of her way of making "certain fictional places -- and a fictional voice -- unmistakably and distinctively her own." In pointing to the influence of O'Connor on the titular story, "Hateship, Friendship, Courtship, Loveship, Marriage," he notes that "if the story were by Flannery O'Connor ... it would have ended in a comedy of the grotesque, with the deluded spinster brought face-to-face with her folly," while "Munro resists the doctrinaire satirist's temptation to humiliate and deprive her seemingly hapless protagonist: Johanna's story is other than the story of pride brought low."

The collection was a National Book Critics Circle Award for Fiction Finalist, listed in the New York Times and Time magazine Best Fiction Books, and received the Los Angeles Times Book Prize for Fiction. In 2024, the New York Times ranked the book #23 of the best 100 books of the 21st century.

"The Bear Came Over the Mountain" features as the closing piece in the 2008 short story collection, My Mistress's Sparrow Is Dead: Great Love Stories, from Chekhov to Munro, edited by novelist Jeffrey Eugenides.

Two of the stories were adapted into films. Based on "The Bear Came Over the Mountain" the 2006 film, Away From Her, was the feature-length directorial debut of fellow Canadian Sarah Polley, who also wrote the screenplay. The 2014 film Hateship, Loveship was based on the titular story. Moving the setting from 1950s rural Ontario to present-day Iowa, the story was adapted by Mark Poirier, directed by Liza Johnson, and marked the feature-length dramatic debut of popular comedic actress Kristen Wiig.
