= Grott =

Grott is a surname. Notable people with the surname include:

- Bogumił Grott (born 1940), Polish historian
- Matt Grott (born 1967), American baseball player

== See also ==
- Gott (surname)
