= Gotts =

English surname

Gotts is a surname, which occurs in the UK originating around Norfolk. There are about 800 bearers of the surname in England. It now occurs in other parts of the world through migration. It is distinct from the similar name Gott, though there appear to be common sources around the 14th century. There are earlier occurrences of the name in 12th and 13th centuries, but no direct linkage has been established from these records to known holders of the name.

== Etymology and history (pre 1538) ==
There are a small number of early records in Norfolk, Lincolnshire and Yorkshire which have been included in references on surname origins, though there are no known family trees showing any linkage back to these references. These references generally confuse the name Gott and Gotts/Gottes into single sources. Bardsley's Dictionary of English & Welsh surnames describes the name Gott as a locative name referring to a water channel or drain as per goyt. Earliest reference quoted is in 1379 in Yorkshire.

Reaney's Dictionary of English Surnames suggests its origin as Gott, Gotts from the name Gotte, quoting references of Gotte filius Wulfrici 1188 in York, and Geoffrey Gottes in Norfolk 1348. The name Gocelin (pronounced Gotselin) is suggested as the origin with petforms Gosse and Got. In Yorkshire & Lincolnshire he suggests this could be Breton origin. A second origin is proposed as deriving from the Middle English words gotte, gut meaning gut, guts, a corpulent or greedy person.

Hanks & Hodges Dictionary of Surnames propose it derives from Gott as Norman English & German, a shortform of Germanic compound names with the first element meaning God. Gotts would therefore be a patronymic of these.

The name ‘Richard Gotts’ is inscribed on the font cover at St George's church in South Acre in Norfolk. His will in 1535 shows him as Rector of South Lynn.

A small number of wills for Gottes and Gotts in North Norfolk through the 1700s are contained in the Norfolk Register Office.

It appears that the majority of people with the name Gott/Gotts were not wealthy enough to leave records in the typical sources for ownership of land and taxes. Given that surnames were not known to be in common use outside land owners prior to the 15th century the linkages from some of these references to modern families have not been substantiated.

== Gotts Coat of Arms ==
A coat of arms was granted during the Visitation of the Heralds to Cambridge in 1585 and 1614 (as the applicant was living in Cambridge) and referenced in Fairbairn. One of the descendants Richard was admitted to the Inner Temple in London on 30 June 1578, however this line appears to have died out.

== Notable people with the surname Gotts ==
- Jim Gotts (1917–1998), footballer for Ashington, Brentford and Brighton & Hove Albion.
- Kath Gotts, composer of the score for Bad Girls
- Robbie Gotts (born 1999), English footballer

== Fictional characters with the surname Gotts ==
- Eric Gotts, American comedy-drama television series Wonderfalls
