= Goats (film) =

- Theatrical release poster
- Directed by: Christopher Neil
- Screenplay by: Mark Poirier
- Based on: Goats by Mark Poirier
- Produced by: Eric Kopeloff; Daniela Taplin Lundberg; Shannon Lail; Christopher Neil
- Starring: David Duchovny; Vera Farmiga; Graham Phillips; Justin Kirk; Keri Russell; Ty Burrell
- Cinematography: Wyatt Troll
- Edited by: Jeremiah O'Driscoll
- Music by: Woody Jackson; Jason Schwartzman
- Production companies: Red Crown Productions; Eva Daniels Productions
- Distributed by: Image Entertainment
- Release dates: January 24, 2012 (Sundance); August 10, 2012 (United States)
- Running time: 94 minutes
- Country: United States
- Language: English
- Budget: $5 million

Goats is a 2012 comedy-drama film directed by Christopher Neil and written by Mark Poirier based on his 2000 novel Goats. The film stars David Duchovny, Vera Farmiga, Graham Phillips, Keri Russell, Justin Kirk, and Ty Burrell. The film premiered at the Sundance Film Festival on January 24, 2012, and was given a limited release in the United States on August 10, 2012, by Image Entertainment.

== Plot ==
Fifteen-year-old Ellis Whitman (Graham Phillips) is leaving his home in Tucson, Arizona, for his freshman year at Gates Academy, an East Coast prep school. He leaves behind Wendy (Vera Farmiga), his flaky, New Age mother and Goat Man (David Duchovny), a weed-smoking goat trekker and botanist. Goat Man is the only real father Ellis has ever known, since his biological father, Frank (Ty Burrell), left when he was a baby.

Upon arriving at Gates Academy, Ellis befriends his roommate Barney Cannel (Nicholas Lobue), a cross-country runner, and Rosenberg, who usually does not get anything higher than a C in his classes, but is smart enough to sneak in marijuana. Ellis also takes an interest in Minnie (Dakota Johnson), a local girl who works in the school library; his friends often refer to her as a prostitute, according to rumors. Meanwhile, Goat Man and Wendy have been incommunicado, which Barney points out often. On a phone call, Ellis discovers that his mother has a new boyfriend named Bennet (Justin Kirk), who is rude and disrespectful.

One day, Ellis receives a letter in the mail from his long-estranged father from Washington, DC, requesting for Ellis to spend Thanksgiving dinner with him. Ellis decides to fly to Washington with Barney, who is also having Thanksgiving with his mother there. Ellis finally meets his father and his father's pregnant and kind-hearted wife, Judy (Keri Russell). One night, Ellis gets a call from Barney telling him that he is in possession of marijuana. Ellis sneaks out for the night, but Frank finds out that he left. On the way back from his flight from DC, Barney and Ellis get drunk and fight with each other in their dorm room, resulting in a dent in the wall which costs Wendy $700 and Ellis to end up in the school hospital. Afterwards, Ellis begins to get closer to Minnie.

Over Christmas break, Ellis returns to Tucson, but feels betrayed by Goat Man when he discovers that he slept with their young but malicious neighbor, Aubrey (Adelaide Kane). His relationship with adults he grew up with is now challenged.

== Cast ==
- David Duchovny as Javier / Goat Man
- Vera Farmiga as Wendy Whitman
- Graham Phillips as Ellis Whitman
- Ty Burrell as Frank Whitman
- Keri Russell as Judy Whitman
- Justin Kirk as Bennet
- Dakota Johnson as Minnie
- Alan Ruck as Dr. Eldridge
- Anthony Anderson as Coach
- Nicholas Lobue as Barney Cannel
- Steve Almazan as Jesus
- Adelaide Kane as Aubrey
- Olga Segura as Serena
- Minnie Driver as Shaman (uncredited)

== Production ==
In May 2010, it was reported that Ty Burrell and Anjelica Huston had signed on to star in the film. In January 2011, it was announced that David Duchovny and Vera Farmiga had been cast in leading roles for the film. That same month, Keri Russell, Minnie Driver and Will Arnett were cast in supporting roles. Arnett and Huston later dropped out of the cast, for unknown reasons, before filming began. Producer Daniela Taplin Lundberg commented on the casting, "Goats is that wonderful combination of hilarious and poignant, and we're so thrilled that actors as distinguished as this ensemble have responded to the script with such passion." Principal photography for the film took place in Albuquerque, New Mexico, Tucson, Arizona, and Watertown, Connecticut in February 2011.

== Release ==
The film had its world premiere at the 2012 Sundance Film Festival on January 24, 2012. Shortly after, on February 7, 2012, the film was acquired by Image Entertainment for domestic distribution in the United States. The film was released in a limited release in the United States on August 10, 2012.

== Reception ==
The film received generally negative reviews from film critics. Goats holds a 19% approval rating on review aggregator website Rotten Tomatoes, based on 27 reviews, with an average rating of 4.69/10. The website's critics consensus reads: "Goats reaches for profundity but mostly offers inane bleating, with David Duchovny's beard proving the most distinguishing feature of this bland dramedy." On Metacritic, the film has a 38 out of 100 rating, based on 13 critic reviews, indicating "generally unfavorable" reviews.

Robert Abele from the Los Angeles Times wrote, "A coming-of-age story featuring Vera Farmiga as a narcissistic New Age mom, David Duchovny as her pot-smoking Jesus-bearded goat herder/poolman and Ty Burrell as the divorced dad with the new wife, would appear to have all sorts of behavioral flavors to chew on. Alas, Goats – to borrow from the traits of its titular ruminants – nibbles on a lot of stuff it never gets around to digesting." Sara Stewart of The New York Post wrote, "There's a particularly irritating type of rich-boy coming-of-age movie in which any emotional growth is reflected in only the slightest tweak on the handsome protagonist's stony visage. If I were Holden Caulfield, I might call it lousy. It's the type of strummy-guitar-scored indie that's flypaper for quirky actors like Farmiga and Duchovny, who are given too much time to indulge their characters' back stories and to show off, respectively, their primal scream and goat imitation."

Lisa Schwarzbaum of Entertainment Weekly wrote, "Mark Jude Poirier adapted the screenplay from his own lively 2001 coming-of-age novel. As directed by Christopher Neil, Goats reports the same events but loses the flavor of the journey." The New York Times' Stephen Holden wrote, "If the aimless characters in Goats didn't feel so uncomfortably lifelike, it would be tempting to heap scorn on this wispy screen adaptation of Mark Jude Poirier's 2001 novel, directed by Christopher Neil from a screenplay by Mr. Poirier. Ms. Farmiga gives a bravely unsympathetic performance as the hysterical, self-pitying Wendy, who is filled with rage at her ex-husband, Frank. For all its verisimilitude, Goats doesn't add up to much."
