= Naked Pueblo =

1998 short story collection by Mark Jude Poirier

- First edition
- Author: Mark Jude Poirier
- Language: English
- Genre: Short stories
- Publisher: Crown
- Publication date: 1998
- Publication place: United States
- Media type: Print
- Pages: 224
- ISBN: 0-609-60447-3

Naked Pueblo is a short story collection written by Mark Jude Poirier and first published by Crown in 1998. Poirier's debut collection, it includes the following stories, all set in and around Tucson, Arizona:-

- "Son of the Monkey Lady"

The narrator tells of his lifelong friend Chigger and his widowed alcoholic mother, and of an evening spent at San Carlos Lake.

- "Before the Barbeque Hoedown" (first appeared in Gulf Coast, summer/Fall 1996)

Jackpot, the daughter of a stripper from Agua Prieta replies to an ad in the Tucson Citizen in order to get out of Eloy and becomes the assistant to a realtor in Tucson dependent on valium.

- "Bear, Bikes, Bug-boy" (first appeared in Green Mountains Review, Fall/Winter 1995-96)

Mulligan tells of a summer spent mountain-biking in Telluride.

- "Cul-de-sacs" (first appeared in Manoa, Fall 1997)

A designer of concrete benches tells of his life spent in a desert cul-de-sac with his wife and niece, including a visit to Pima Air Museum.

- "Let them Love!"

Snider's tells of his mother's relationships following his father's departure to lead a church.

- "Something Good"

Grant works in a Value Village thrift store; taking his pick of the donated goods before they reach the shelves.

- "Disciplinary Log" (first appeared in JANE, November 1998)

Linda Hardiman's log of the behaviour of Charles Hackenbush in her art lessons and the punishment she applies.

- "Monkey Chow" (first appeared in Aethlon: The Journal of Sport Literature, Summer 1995)

Three rock climbers head for Joshua Tree relying on shop lifting for food and syphoning to provide petrol for their trip.

- "La Zona Roja" (first appeared in BOMB, June 1997)

Sam tells of his trips to strip joints in Nogales with his old friend Beezer and of the strain this puts on his marriage to Becky who is working on a dissertation on Botero entitled The Sensuality of Plump.

- "Pray for Beans" (first appeared in Coe Review, May 1997)

Maxim's middle name is Jude. Harper believes he is therefore able to influence St. Jude in praying for her brother and promises to cook beans for him if he visits shrines on her behalf.

- "Ska Boy, 1986"

Ted tells of his life as a mod in the Tucson ska scene including a clash with skinheads.

- "Tilt-a-Whirl" (first appeared in Laurel Review, Fall 1997)

Tells the story of how 'Monkey Lady' (from the first story) lost her foot on a tilt-a-whirl ride
