= Goat Creek =

Goat Creek or Goat's Creek may refer to:

- Goat Creek (Alberta), a creek near Mount Rundle
- Goat Creek (Idaho), connected to many bodies of water; see List of lakes of the Sawtooth Mountains (Idaho)
- Goat Creek, a major tributary for the Clearwater River (British Columbia)
- Goat Creek (or Sierra Creek), a tributary of the Dry Creek (Sacramento River)
- Goat Creek, former name for the Deception River in New Zealand
- Goat Creek, former name for Mazama, Washington
- Goat Creek, a tributary of the Salmon River (Clackamas County, Oregon)
- Goat's Creek, a river located on the Dardanelles, site of a major battle of the Peloponnesian War

== See also ==
- Goat River (disambiguation)
- Goat Lake (disambiguation)
