= The Worst Years of Your Life =

First edition

The Worst Years of Your Life: Stories for the Geeked-Out, Angst-Ridden, Lust-Addled, and Deeply Misunderstood Adolescent in All of Us is a short story collection edited by Mark Jude Poirier.

The collection was published in 2007 by Simon & Schuster and includes short fiction by George Saunders, Jennifer Egan, A. M. Homes, and Nathan Englander.
