= GOT =

GOT, Got, or got may refer to:

== Arts and entertainment ==
- Game of Thrones, a fantasy television series (2011–2019)
- God of Thunder (video game), a 1993 puzzle game
- Ghost of Tsushima, a 2020 action-adventure game

== Science and technology ==
- Geranyl-pyrophosphate—olivetolic acid geranyltransferase, a plant enzyme
- Glutamic oxaloacetic transaminase, an animal enzyme
- Global Offset Table, in a computer program binary

== Transport ==
- GO Transit, Ontario, Canada
- Göteborg Landvetter Airport, Sweden (IATA:GOT)

== Other uses ==
- Got (bull), an animal clone
- Gothic language, once spoken across Europe (ISO 639:got)
- Gottschalks, a defunct American department store (NYSE:GOT)

== People with the surname Got ==
- François Jules Edmond Got (1822–1901), actor and librettist
- Pascale Got (born 1961), politician
- Raoul Got (1900–1955), rugby player

== See also ==
- Gott (disambiguation)
