= GATT (disambiguation) =

GATT or the General Agreement on Tariffs and Trade is a legal agreement between many countries, whose overall purpose was to promote international trade.

Gatt or GATT may also refer to:

- Gonioscopy-assisted transluminal trabeculotomy (GATT), a minimally invasive glaucoma surgery technique (see Minimally invasive glaucoma surgery)
- Gatt (surname)
- Gatt Gatt the Bat, a nickname given to Mike Gatting, an English cricketer
- Generic Attribute Profile, a data exchange protocol in Bluetooth Low Energy
