= Smart People =

2008 film by Noam Murro

- Theatrical release poster
- Directed by: Noam Murro
- Written by: Mark Poirier
- Produced by: Bridget Johnson; Michael London; Michael Costigan; Bruna Papandrea
- Starring: Dennis Quaid; Sarah Jessica Parker; Thomas Haden Church; Ellen Page; Ashton Holmes
- Cinematography: Toby Irwin
- Edited by: Robert Frazen; Yana Gorskaya
- Music by: Nuno Bettencourt
- Production companies: Groundswell Productions; Grosvenor Park
- Distributed by: Miramax Films (North America); QED International (International)
- Release dates: January 20, 2008 (Sundance); April 11, 2008
- Running time: 95 minutes
- Country: United States
- Languages: English; Spanish
- Box office: $11.8 million

Smart People is a 2008 American comedy-drama film starring Dennis Quaid, Sarah Jessica Parker, Elliot Page, and Thomas Haden Church. The film was directed by Noam Murro, written by Mark Poirier and produced by Michael London, with Omar Amanat serving as executive producer. Smart People was filmed on location in Pittsburgh, Pennsylvania, including several scenes at Carnegie Mellon University and the Pittsburgh International Airport. Premiering at the 2008 Sundance Film Festival, North American distribution rights were acquired by Miramax Films and the film was released widely on April 11, 2008.

== Plot ==
Carnegie Mellon English Professor Lawrence Wetherhold (Dennis Quaid) is a widowed parent of an alienated college son, James (Ashton Holmes), overachieving high school daughter, Vanessa (Elliot Page), and sibling to an adopted ne'er-do-well brother, Chuck (Thomas Haden Church) whom he cannot evade enough. He is bitter, arrogant, self-absorbed, and uninterested in his students. This becomes a problem when he parks illegally on campus. The car is impounded and the security guard, a disgruntled former student, refuses him access. Lawrence has a trauma-induced seizure after falling from the top of a fence after retrieving his briefcase from inside the impounded car.

In the emergency room, he is treated by Dr. Janet Hartigan (Sarah Jessica Parker). Lawrence needs to get about, but is not allowed to drive. His step-brother Chuck is without a place to sleep or a job, so Vanessa sets up what he characterizes as a "win/win" solution — he will be Lawrence's live-in driver.

At a follow-up appointment, Lawrence learns that Janet had been one of his students. She sees him waiting in the cold outside the hospital, as Chuck has failed to show up, and insists on taking him home. When they arrive, he asks Janet to later meet for coffee and she agrees, fulfilling her old student crush on the professor. Vanessa confronts Janet, warning her about Lawrence's fragility. At dinner, Lawrence monopolizes the conversation and Janet walks out.

Lawrence visits the emergency room to see Janet again and she acquiesces to a second, "face to face conversation." After their wineless date, they return to Janet's place where they consummate their mutual attraction, but while spending the night, Janet is struck by a sudden bout of insecurity, and feigns being called in to work and does not return any of his subsequent calls. During a contentious family Christmas dinner at the Wetherholds', Janet arrives with a cake, unexpectedly though Lawrence had invited her earlier.

Chuck and Vanessa celebrate her early acceptance into Stanford University, and drunkenly she makes a pass at him, which he rejects. He then moves in part-time with Lawrence's son, James, in his college dormitory.

James' girlfriend Missy (Camille Mana), who is one of his father's students, tells Lawrence how James has had a poem accepted by The New Yorker. By contrast, Lawrence's latest book has been universally rejected. A new title, You Can't Read! (Vanessa's idea) helps sell the book to Penguin Group, a largely non-academic publisher. To Lawrence's dismay, however, the book is largely re-worked by the publisher, only vaguely resembling his original work. Janet accompanies Lawrence to New York to meet with the publisher, where she discovers she is pregnant. Finding him preoccupied with his book's publication, and with an ongoing campaign to become chairman of the English Department, Janet is again upset by Lawrence's self-absorption and breaks up with him without telling him the news.

Back in Pittsburgh, Lawrence is confronted by James and Chuck, who both point to his apparent lack of interest in his children's lives. Encouraged by Chuck, Lawrence goes to the hospital to reconcile with Janet, who reveals her pregnancy. He has meanwhile dropped his bid to become department head and has become a more involved parent and professor.

During the end credits, Lawrence and Janet cradle twin babies: a boy named Sonny and a girl named Cher.

== Cast ==
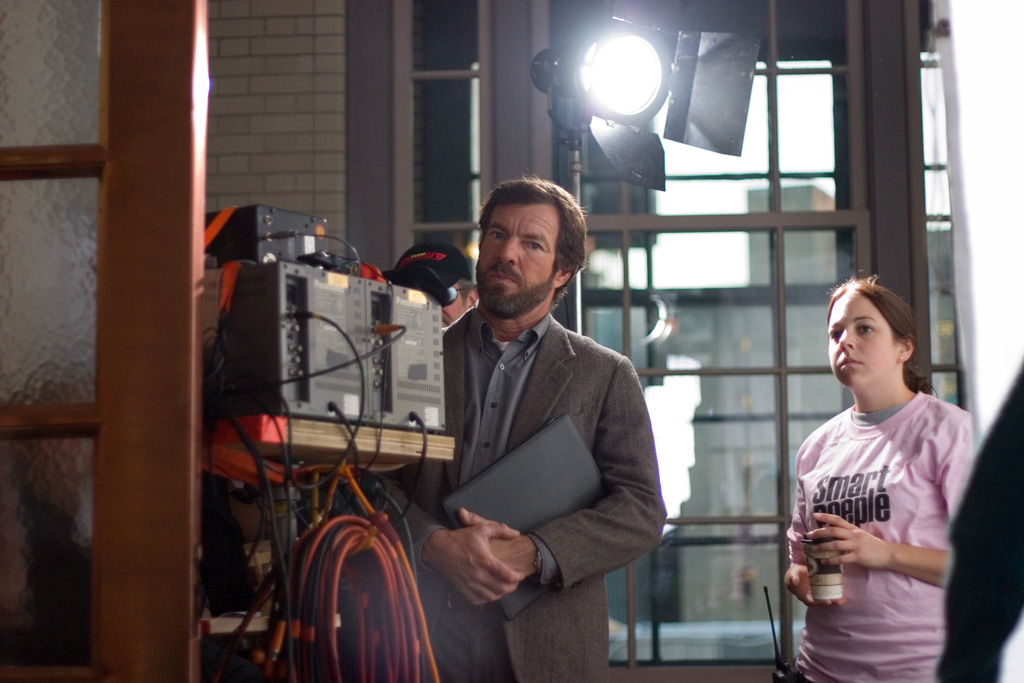
Dennis Quaid on the set of Smart People at Carnegie Mellon University, Pittsburgh, PA.

- Dennis Quaid as Lawrence Wetherhold
- Sarah Jessica Parker as Janet Hartigan, Lawrence's love interest, and later, second wife
- Thomas Haden Church as Chuck Wetherhold, Lawrence's adoptive younger brother
- Elliot Page (credited as Ellen Page) as Vanessa Wetherhold, Lawrence's oldest daughter
- Ashton Holmes as James Wetherhold, Lawrence's oldest son
- Christine Lahti as Nancy
- Camille Mana as Missy Chin, James' girlfriend
- David Denman as Dr. William Strouse
- Scott A Martin as Weller
- Don Wadsworth as Hadley
- Richard John Walters as Parking Lot Attendant

== Production ==
The film was originally set at Georgetown University in Washington, D.C., but filming an independent film in that city was deemed too difficult. Filming at Carnegie Mellon in Pittsburgh occurred in November and December 2006. The house used as the Wetherholds' is in the Pittsburgh neighborhood of Friendship. The shooting schedule was compressed by Hollywood standards, at 29 days. Rachel Weisz was initially cast as Janet Hartigan, but was replaced by Sarah Jessica Parker before filming began. According to the director, Noam Murro, in the audio commentary of the DVD, filming was actually completed before that of Juno. The photographs of the cast holding twin babies in the credits appear to be a nod to actor Dennis Quaid's twins born in November 2007, and his subsequent awareness campaign over medical drug dosage errors.

== Soundtrack ==
The soundtrack from Smart People was released on April 8, 2008, and contained music by Nuno Bettencourt.

1. "This Is Your Life" by Nuno Bettencourt.
2. "Q.P.D." by Nuno Bettencourt.
3. "Stitch" by Baby Animals.
4. "Early Checkout" by Nuno Bettencourt.
5. "Need I Say More" by Cherone.
6. "Rush You" by Baby Animals.
7. "Lotus" by Nuno Bettencourt.
8. "Flow" by Nuno Bettencourt.
9. "You Still Need Me" by Baby Animals.
10. "School Girl Crush" by Nuno Bettencourt.
11. "If Only" by Nuno Bettencourt.
12. "Hamburger In Bed" by Nuno Bettencourt.
13. "Pursuit of Happiness" by Nuno Bettencourt.

== Reception ==
On the review aggregator website Rotten Tomatoes, 50% of 151 reviews are positive, with an average rating of 5.7/10. The website's critical consensus reads, "Despite its sharp cast and a few laughs, Smart People is too thinly plotted to fully resonate." According to Metacritic, which assigned a weighted average score of 57 out of 100 based on 33 critics, the film received "mixed or average reviews". The Los Angeles Times, The Wall Street Journal, and The New York Times all gave the film more positive reviews. In its opening weekend, the film grossed an estimated $4.2 million in 1,106 theaters in the United States and Canada, ranking #7 at the box office. The first week gross was estimated at $5.7 million. As of July 29, 2008, the movie has received $9,511,289 in the United States box office while receiving $1,069,335 overseas making a worldwide gross of $11,839,695.
