= Modern Ranch Living =

2004 novel by Mark Poirier

- First edition cover
- Author: Mark Poirier
- Language: English
- Genre: Fiction
- Published: 2004
- Publisher: Miramax Books
- Publication place: United States

Modern Ranch Living is a 2004 novel by Mark Poirier and was published by Miramax Books.

== Plot ==
The novel concerns the connection between a pair of very different loners during a hot summer in Arizona.
