= Hateship, Loveship =

2013 film by Liza Johnson

- Theatrical release poster
- Directed by: Liza Johnson
- Written by: Mark Poirier
- Based on: "Hateship, Friendship, Courtship, Loveship, Marriage" by Alice Munro
- Produced by: Cassian Elwes; Dylan Sellers; Jamin O'Brien; Michael Benaroya; Robert Ogden Barnum
- Starring: Kristen Wiig; Hailee Steinfeld; Guy Pearce; Jennifer Jason Leigh; Nick Nolte
- Cinematography: Kasper Tuxen
- Edited by: Michael Taylor
- Music by: Dickon Hinchliffe
- Production companies: Benaroya Pictures; Venture Forth; Fork Films; The Film Community; Union Entertainment Group
- Distributed by: IFC Films
- Release dates: September 7, 2013 (TIFF); April 11, 2014 (United States)
- Running time: 102 minutes
- Country: United States
- Language: English
- Budget: $3.8 million
- Box office: $83,008

Hateship, Loveship is a 2013 American drama film directed by Liza Johnson and written by Mark Poirier, based on the 2001 short story "Hateship, Friendship, Courtship, Loveship, Marriage" by Alice Munro. The film stars Kristen Wiig, Hailee Steinfeld, Guy Pearce, Jennifer Jason Leigh and Nick Nolte. It premiered at the 2013 Toronto International Film Festival on September 6, 2013.

== Plot ==
Johanna Parry must move to a new town to begin work as a housekeeper for Mr. McCauley, an elderly man who needs help keeping house, and to be a caretaker for McCauley's granddaughter, Sabitha. She meets Sabitha's father and McCauley's son-in-law, Ken, who does not live with Sabitha or McCauley, but instead resides in Chicago. Sabitha's best friend, Edith, tells Johanna (after Johanna asks where Sabitha's mother lives) that Ken's wife died several years ago. After inviting Johanna and Sabitha to dinner, Ken writes a friendly note to Johanna, which his daughter delivers. Johanna writes a response letter and Sabitha's friend Edith offers to take it to the post office and mail it. Instead, she intercepts the letter and, as a cruel joke, the two teenagers forge a love note from Ken, addressed to Johanna. Then they set up a fake email account for Ken (who does not have email). They impersonate him, responding to love emails from Johanna. "Ken" calls her "my only friend" but things may change when "Ken" asks Johanna to visit him in Chicago.

== Cast ==
- Kristen Wiig as Johanna Parry
- Hailee Steinfeld as Sabitha
- Guy Pearce as Ken
- Jennifer Jason Leigh as Chloe
- Nick Nolte as Mr. McCauley
- Sami Gayle as Edith
- Christine Lahti as Eileen
- Grant Case as Mover
- Casey Hendershot as Mover
- Brett Roedel as Jason
- Brian Roedel as Justin
- Joel K. Berger as Stevie

== Production ==
=== Filming ===
The shooting of the film, originally titled Hateship, Friendship, began in November 2012 in New Orleans, Louisiana. The film was shot with Arri Alexa digital cameras and Kowa anamorphic lenses. Michael Benaroya is financing the film.

== Reception ==
On review aggregator website Rotten Tomatoes, the film holds an approval rating of 51% based on 55 reviews, with an average rating of 6.0/10. The site's critics consensus reads, "Kristen Wiig's vibrant performance is almost worth the price of admission -- and it has to be, because Hateship Loveship doesn't have much else going for it." At Metacritic, the film has a weighted average score of 59 out of 100, based on 21 critics, indicating "mixed or average" reviews.

Ann Hornaday of The Washington Post gave the film three stars, praising Johnson's direction. Sheila O’Malley of RogerEbert.com and Dana Stevens of Slate commended Johnson for not veering into melodrama. In contrast, Amy Nicholson of LA Weekly praised the cast, but said the film is "too painful to be uplifting, too private to explore what was clearly child abuse". Bilge Ebiri in Vulture said the film suffers from tonal unevenness and underdeveloped subplots and characters.

Wiig's performance as Johanna received near unanimous praise. Hornaday wrote Wiig's "cipherlike impassivity at first threatens to make 'Hateship Loveship' fatally inert, but then begins to pay off as the film heads to one of the more startling third acts in recent memory." She added "we’ve never seen a protagonist quite like Johanna, who on the one hand personifies female self-abnegation at its most domesticated, but on the other embodies the sheer will at its most stubborn. She knows the value of elbow grease, whether she’s redeeming a dirty kitchen floor or even a scruffier human soul." O’Malley gave the film 4 out of 4 stars and wrote, "In the short story on which the film is based, Alice Munro writes of Johanna: 'It was the rare person who took to her, and she'd been aware of that for a long time.' Wiig has absorbed that character description until Johanna seems as though a role she was born to play. There is not a hint of condescension in her portrayal. You worry for her. You are embarrassed for her. You feel protective; you wince at her openness. You keep discovering how much you have under-estimated her. It's a great performance."
