= Unsung Heroes of American Industry =

First edition

Unsung Heroes of American Industry is a 2001 short story collection by Mark Jude Poirier.

It was published by Miramax Books. It includes the short stories "Buttons", "Worms", "Gators", "Pageantry", and "A Note on the Type".
