= Goat River =

Goat River may refer to:

One of three rivers in British Columbia, Canada:

- Goat River (Kootenay River), a tributary of the Kootenay River, joining it at the town of Creston
- Goat River (Fraser River), a tributary of the upper Fraser on the east side of the Cariboo Mountains
- Goat River (Central Coast), a river on the Central Coast of British Columbia, opening on Ursula Channel opposite Gribbell Island

It may also refer to:

- Goat River railway station in British Columbia
- Goat River Rapids, a saltwater rapid in Ursula Channel on the Central Coast of British Columbia
- Goat River, a stoner/doom band from Toulouse, France.

== See also ==
- Goat (disambiguation)
- Goat Creek (disambiguation)
