= The Greatest of All Time (soundtrack) =

2024 soundtrack album by Yuvan Shankar Raja

- Soundtrack album cover

Soundtrack album by Yuvan Shankar Raja
- Released: 3 September 2024
- Recorded: 2023–2024
- Studio: U1 Records, Chennai; AI Watan Studios, Dubai; High Tide Studios, Germany; Ilaiyaraaja Studios, Chennai; Chennai Strings Orchestra, Chennai
- Genre: Film soundtrack
- Length: 16:53
- Language: Tamil
- Label: T-Series; Sony Music India
- Producer: Yuvan Shankar Raja

Yuvan Shankar Raja chronology
Gangs of Godavari (2024)	The Greatest of All Time (2024)	Parachute (2024)

Singles from The Greatest of All Time
- 1. "Whistle Podu" Released: 14 April 2024; 2. "Chinna Chinna Kangal" Released: 22 June 2024; 3. "Spark" Released: 3 August 2024; 4. "Matta" Released: 31 August 2024

The Greatest of All Time is the soundtrack album composed by Yuvan Shankar Raja for the 2024 Tamil-language film of the same name, which is directed by Venkat Prabhu and stars Vijay alongside Prashanth, Prabhu Deva, Ajmal Ameer and Mohan.

The album featured four songs, with all of them being previously released as singles. It was planned to be released with the film's audio launch event, before its cancelation. The album was released via T-Series on 3 September 2024, two days before the film's release.

== Background ==
Yuvan shared a long-standing personal and working relationship with Prabhu; since the latter's directorial debut with Chennai 600028 (2007), he would score all of his films with the exception of Manmadha Leelai (2022) and the unreleased Party, composed by Prabhu's brother Premgi Amaren. Yuvan's only composition for a Vijay-starrer was Pudhiya Geethai (2003). In December 2021, he shared a picture with Vijay on his X (formerly Twitter) account indicating a possible reunion. On 21 May 2023, AGS Entertainment officially announced the film with Prabhu and Yuvan's involvement as the director and musician; This would be his second film with Vijay after two decades. The songs in the film were written by Prabhu's father Gangai Amaran, Madhan Karky, Kabilan Vairamuthu and Vivek. Initially, Arivu was signed to write on song, but was subsequently replaced with Vivek due to reasons unknown.

== Production and composition ==
In September 2023, at the Panacea23 event at SRM Institute of Science and Technology, Chennai, Yuvan revealed about the first single which would be a dappankuthu number. The aforementioned song (later deciphered to be "Whistle Podu") was shot during the first schedule, and it was recorded during late-October 2023, commencing the music production, and vocals performed by Vijay himself.

The number "Chinna Chinna Kangal" was composed by Yuvan in January 2024 at Bangalore. At that time, he wanted the song to be sung by his sister Bhavatharini, but she died from cancer on 25 January 2024. Her vocals were generated via artificial intelligence by the music production company Pitch Innovations. The company's CEO, T. R. Krishna Chetan, recalled that the team assembled the singer's previous recordings at various pitches and styles, for the studio-quality AI model and a pilot version of the song was recorded with Priyanka NK's vocals which was then replaced with Bhavatharini's AI generated vocals. After listening to a snippet of her vocals, Vijay felt emotional and impressed, and agreed to perform the vocals for the male counterpart.

Yuvan commenced recording the film's background score during late-July 2024. Yuvan collaborated with the Budapest Scoring Orchestra for re-recording, where some of the cues had resembled the theme from Mission: Impossible.

== Release ==
=== Singles ===
On April 14, celebrating the occasion of Tamil New Year, the first single, "Whistle Podu", was released from the film. Sung by Vijay with lyrics penned by Madhan Karky, its title was perceived by some media as an allusion to the Chennai Super Kings' anthem. The song received a mixed response from fans, although some felt its reception would improve with time.

The second single "Chinna Chinna Kangal" was released on 22 June, coinciding with Vijay's 50th birthday. Prior to its release, the song was leaked to social media pages, which leaded to the makers filling copyright notice to the accounts who were spreading the leaked footage throughout the platforms and officially releasing it earlier on 5:30pm (IST) rather than the initially planned time, 6:00pm. Despite this, the song topped the most-viewed video globally on YouTube in the past 24 hours with 4.5 million views.

The third single, titled "Spark", was released on 3 August. The song received mixed response from audiences.

The fourth single, titled "Matta" was released on 31 August, coinciding Yuvan's birthday.

=== Cancelled audio launch plans ===
In May 2024, it was reported that the film's audio launch would take place in Malaysia or Singapore. But an article from The Times of India, revealed that the event would be held in Chennai during mid-August; it further claimed that Vijay would skip the forthcoming event due to his political commitments.

=== Extended soundtrack ===
The film also features a couple of additional tracks, the theatrical version of "Whistle Podu," sung by Vijay, Yuvan, Premgi Amaren, and Venkat Prabhu, and "Lonely Lullaby," with lyrics penned by Vignesh Ramakrishna and sung by Haricharan. These tracks were officially released as part of the movie's OST Jukebox Vol. 1, one month after the movie's release on October 4.

Yuvan also remixed "Sorgame Endralum", a classic song originally composed by Ilaiyaraaja for Ooru Vittu Ooru Vanthu. This version features vocals by Ilaiyaraaja, Yuvan Shankar Raja, and S. Janaki and was officially released on October 21, 2024, via Sony Music South's YouTube channel.

== Reception ==
"Whistle Podu" became the most-viewed song in the first 24 hours, amassing 25.5 million views on YouTube. It also topped the global chart on YouTube, becoming the most-watched video in the past 24 hours. By reaching this feat, "Whistle Podu" broke the record set by "Arabic Kuthu" (23.7 million views) from Beast. Additionally, the lyrical video garnered 1 million likes on YouTube, making it the fastest lyrical video to achieve this milestone.

== Track listing ==
=== Original ===
No.	Title	Lyrics	Singer(s)	Length
1.	"Whistle Podu"	Madhan Karky	Vijay, Yuvan Shankar Raja	4:47
2.	"Chinna Chinna Kangal"	Kabilan Vairamuthu	Vijay, Bhavatharini (Note: Via artificial intelligence, originally sung by Priyanka NK.)	4:29
3.	"Spark"	Gangai Amaran	Yuvan Shankar Raja, Vrusha Balu	4:10
4.	"Matta"	Vivek	Yuvan Shankar Raja, Shenbagaraj, Velu, Sam, Narayanan Ravishankar	3:32
Total length:				16:53

Extended Soundtrack
No.	Title	Lyrics	Singer(s)	Length
1.	"Sorgame Endralum Remix" (Originally composed by Ilaiyaraaja and remixed by Yuvan Shankar Raja)	Gangai Amaran	Ilaiyaraaja, S. Janaki, Yuvan Shankar Raja	3:08
2.	"Whistle Podu Theatrical"	Madhan Karky	Vijay, Yuvan Shankar Raja, Venkat Prabhu, Premgi Amaren	4:15
3.	"Lonely Lullaby"	Vignesh Ramakrishna	Haricharan	2:53
4.	"Whistle Podu Sat Night Mix" (Remix by Premgi Amaren)	Madhan Karky	Vijay, Premgi Amaren	2:22
Total length:				28:51

=== Telugu ===
No.	Title	Lyrics	Singer(s)	Length
1.	"Whistleaesko"	Ramajogayya Sastry	Yuvan Shankar Raja, Nakash Aziz	4:47
2.	"Ninnu Kanna Kanulae"	Ramajogayya Sastry	Yuvan Shankar Raja, S. P. Charan, K. S. Chithra	4:30
3.	"Spark"	Ramajogayya Sastry	Yuvan Shankar Raja, Vrusha Balu	4:10
4.	"Masthie"	Ramajogayya Sastry	Yuvan Shankar Raja, Shenbagaraj, Velu, Sam, Narayanan Ravishankar	3:32
Total length:				16:53

=== Hindi ===
No.	Title	Lyrics	Singer(s)	Length
1.	"Whistle Podu"	Raqueeb Alam	Yuvan Shankar Raja, Nakash Aziz	4:41
2.	"Chhoti Chhoti Aankhen"	Raqueeb Alam	Yuvan Shankar Raja, Javed Ali, K. S. Chithra	4:30
3.	"Spark"	Raqueeb Alam	Yuvan Shankar Raja, Kunal Ganjawala, Vrusha Balu	4:10
4.	"Aaya"	Raqueeb Alam	Yuvan Shankar Raja, Vrusha Balu	3:32
Total length:				16:47

== Background score ==
The Greatest of All Time

Film score by Yuvan Shankar Raja
- Released: 4 October 2024; 22 October 2024
- Recorded: 2023–2024
- Studio: U1 Records, Chennai; AI Watan Studios, Dubai; High Tide Studios, Germany; Ilaiyaraaja Studios, Chennai; Chennai Strings Orchestra, Chennai
- Genre: Film score
- Length: 23:22
- Language: Tamil
- Label: T-Series
- Producer: Yuvan Shankar Raja

Volume 1
No.	Title	Length
1.	"Captain Lives On"	2:20
2.	"Echos Of The Past"	1:34
3.	"Mission Gandhi"	0:56
4.	"Srinidhi Blossoms"	0:44
5.	"Metro Madness"	1:24
6.	"Shadows Of The Dark"	1:47
7.	"The Real Og"	1:12
Total length:		10:38

Volume 2
No.	Title	Length
1.	"The Goat"	0:50
2.	"Captain In Action"	1:03
3.	"Bangkok Misery"	1:25
4.	"Welcome To Moscow"	1:26
5.	"Moscow Memoirs"	1:28
6.	"On Da Run In Moscow"	2:46
7.	"Menon Is Alive"	1:01
8.	"Sunil Vs Kalyan"	1:15
9.	"Goat Of Chepauk"	1:29
Total length:		12:44

== Controversy ==
Following the release of "Whistle Podu", a social activist filed a police complaint at Mylapore Police Station in Chennai to DGP Office, stating that the lyrical video did not feature any disclaimer on drinking or smoking and promotes drug addiction and rowdyism to the youth, demanding an action towards Vijay and ban to the song.
