= Mark Poirier =

American novelist

- Born: Mark Jude Poirier; Tucson, Arizona, U.S.
- Education: B.A. 1991, Georgetown University M.A 1992, Stanford University M.A. 1994, Johns Hopkins University MFA 1997, The University of Iowa
- Occupations: Novelist; short story writer; screenwriter
- Partner: Edward Cahill
- Writing career
- Genre: Fiction
- Notable works: Goats; Modern Ranch Living; Smart People
- Movement: Postmodern

Mark Jude Poirier is an American novelist, short story writer and screenwriter.

He grew up in Tucson, Arizona, the fifth child in a family of eleven children. He lives in New York City with his partner, Edward Cahill.

== Career ==
He wrote the novels Modern Ranch Living and Goats as well as the short story collections Unsung Heroes of American Industry and Naked Pueblo.

He served as the editor of the book The Worst Years of Your Life: Stories for the Geeked-Out, Angst-Ridden, Lust-Addled, and Deeply Misunderstood Adolescent in All of Us, including short pieces by George Saunders, Jennifer Egan, A. M. Homes and Nathan Englander.

In 2015, Scribner published Intro to Alien Invasion, a satirical graphic novel he co-wrote with Owen King.

At one time, Poirier was named "the young American writer to watch" by the Times Literary Supplement. He has been the recipient of a Maytag Fellowship and a James Michener Fellowship.

He is currently working as a screenwriter and is the author of Smart People and the adaptation of his novel Goats. In 2014, IFC released Hateship Loveship an adaptation of an Alice Munro story. He was awarded a Chesterfield Screenwriting Fellowship with Paramount Pictures.

In 2018, Poirier received a Pushcart Prize for his story "Mentor," which was originally published in Crazyhorse, and an O. Henry Prize for "How We Eat," which originally appeared in Epoch. His stories have appeared in Tin House, BOMB, The Southern Review, Subtropics, and many other literary magazines and anthologies.

He is a graduate of the Iowa Writers' Workshop, the Writing Seminars at Johns Hopkins University, Georgetown University, and Stanford University. He taught at Bennington College and Columbia University. For five years he was the Briggs-Copeland Lecturer on English at Harvard University where he taught creative writing.

== Screenplays ==
- Hateship, Loveship (2013)
- Goats (2012)
- Smart People (2008)

== Novels ==
- Modern Ranch Living (2004)
- Goats (2000)

== Short story collections ==
- Unsung Heroes of American Industry (2003)
- Naked Pueblo (1998)
