= Gatt (surname) =

Gatt is a surname of Scottish as well as Southeast German origin, which can also be found in Malta.

In Bavarian speaking areas of Germany and Austria the name may derive from the Middle High German word gate (cf. German Gatte: husband, male spouse) for "companion", whereas in Scotland a derivation from the surname Gault or the Middle English gate meaning road, thoroughfare or passage, referring to a family's residence near a main road, is possible. As a Maltese surname it may be derived from the Italian ″gatto″ (engl.: cat) or the female given name Agata.

Notable people with the name Gatt include:

- Austin Gatt (born 1953), Maltese politician
- Clifford Gatt Baldacchino (born 1988), Maltese international footballer
- Jade Gatt (born 1978), Australian actor
- Joseph Gatt (born 1974), English actor
- Josephine Gatt Ciancio (born 1946), Maltese social scientist
- Joshua Gatt (born 1991), American soccer player
- Juri Gatt (born 2001), Austrian luger
- Martin Gatt (born 1937), British classical bassoonist
