= The Goat, Kensington =

Pub in Kensington High Street, London, England

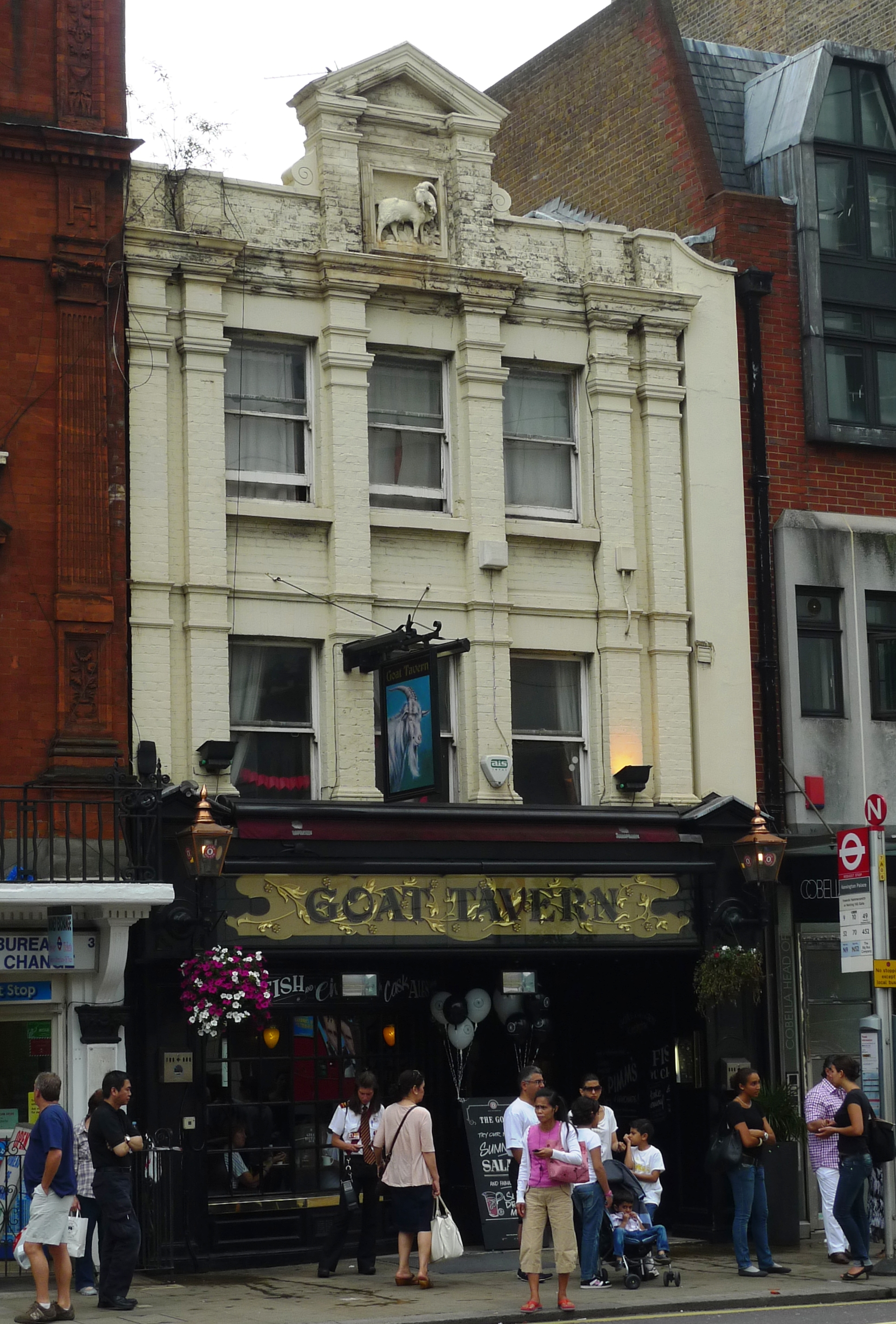
- The Goat Tavern, Kensington, London

- Location within Royal Borough of Kensington and Chelsea Location within Greater London

General information
- Location: 3a Kensington High Street, London, England
- Coordinates: 51.5022°N 0.1877°W
- Construction started: 1695

The Goat is a public house in Kensington, London, at 3a Kensington High Street, which dates back to 1695. It is where the English serial killer John George Haigh, the "Acid Bath Murderer", met his first victim.

== History ==
The Goat is the oldest remaining pub on Kensington High Street, being constructed in 1695. The area had become a regular east–west route when King William built Kensington Palace and The Goat was the first significant building on this new thoroughfare. It was built as a coffeehouse but by 1702 it was an alehouse. In 1707, the freehold was purchased by the local parish for £80, using funds from the legacies of two women who had left money for education and support of the poor. The income from the alehouse was then used to support the poor and the National School which had been established in Kensington in 1645. There were extensive alterations in 1880. Around 1896, a new pub sign was painted by the Beggarstaffs, who had their studio in Kensington at the time. This endured into the twentieth century and impressed the local art aficiando Oliver Brown.

=== John George Haigh, the "Acid Bath Murderer" ===
In 1944, the English serial killer John George Haigh, the "Acid Bath Murderer", had a chance meeting in the Goat with William McSwann, a wealthy owner of amusement arcades, for whom he had worked as a chauffeur in 1936, before spending time in prison for fraud.

They met at The Goat again at about 6pm on 9 September, when they had some glasses of wine and a meal, after which Haigh enticed McSwann to his workshop nearby at 79 Gloucester Road (now the basement of a branch of Kentucky Fried Chicken), broke his skull with a pinball table leg, and dumped his body in a 40-gallon tub which he filled with sulphuric acid. Haigh went on to kill McSwann's parents almost a year later, and dissolved their corpses in sulphuric acid elsewhere, before assuming McSwann's identity and selling all of his parents' properties.

=== Secret tunnels to Kensington Palace ===
There are many rumours of tunnels linking the pub to Kensington Palace, which it overlooks, and although there are extensive vaults under the road, and perhaps tunnels into the grounds, no tunnel to the palace itself has yet been found.

== Present day ==
In 2016, the pub was owned by the Taylor Walker pub chain. It is now called the Goat Tavern and part of the Greene King pub chain.

== Sign ==
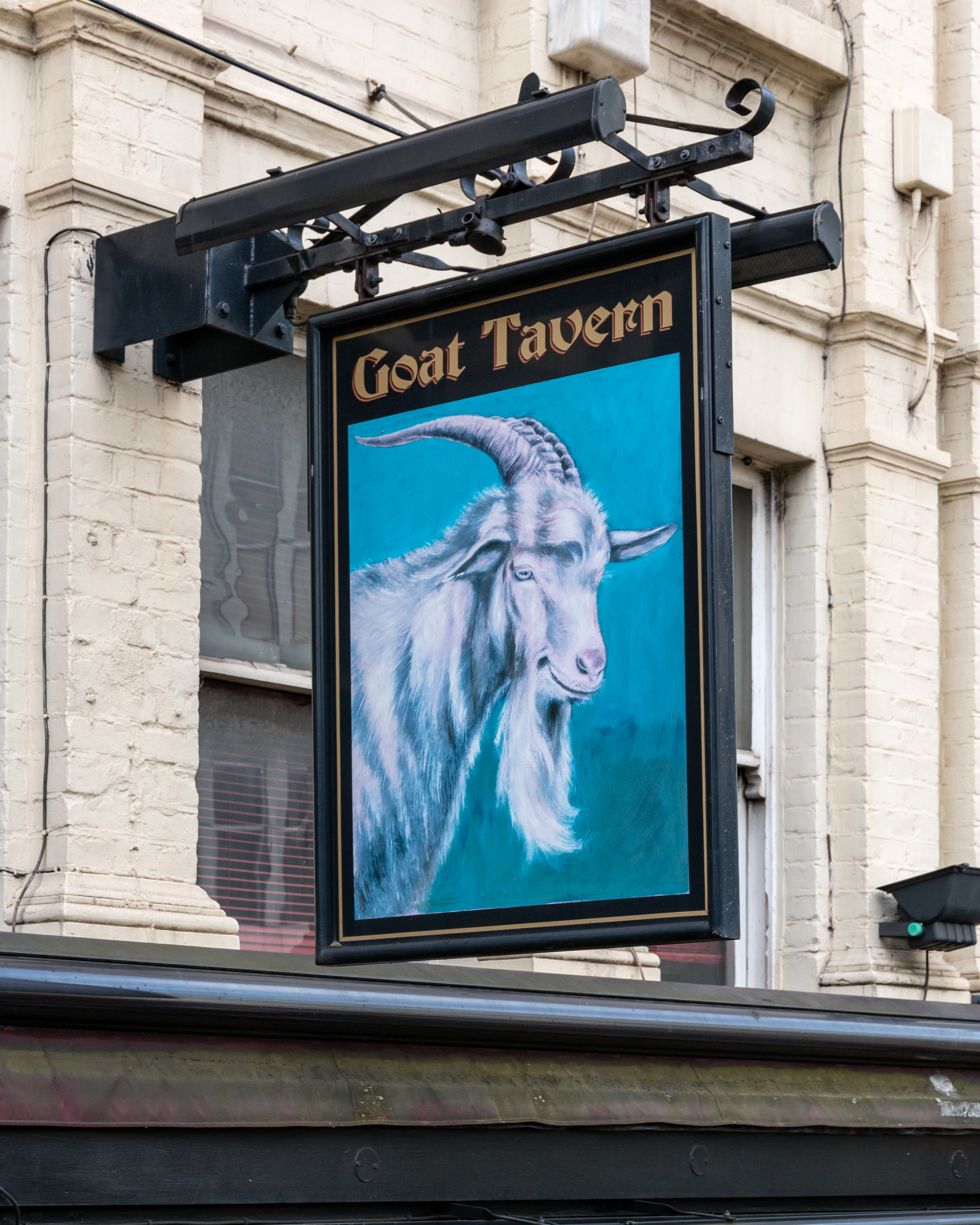
The pub's sign in 2016
