= Goat (Japanese band) =

Japanese experimental music band

goat (jp)
- Origin: Osaka, Japan
- Genres: experimental; experimental rock; math rock; minimalism
- Years active: 2013-present
- Label: EM Records
- Members: Koshiro Hino; Atsumi Tagami; Akihiko Ando; Takafumi Okada; Rai Tateishi
- Past members: Tetsushi Nishikawa

Goat (jp) is a Japanese experimental music band that formed in Osaka in 2013. The group is led by multi-instrumentalist and composer Koshiro Hino, and currently performs in a five-piece formation, including guitar, bass, two drummers, and wind instruments, with several members doubling on percussion. They have released three studio albums, most recently Joy in Fear on Hino's self-founded label, Nakid, and have made several tours in Japan and internationally in Europe.

On Joy in Fear, the band members included Koshiro Hino (guitar), Atsumi Tagami (bass), Akihiko Ando (saxophone), Takafumi Okada, (drums), and Rai Tateishi (percussion, bamboo flute, Irish flute). Tetsushi Nishikawa was the original drummer on their first two albums, but departed the group in 2016, and was replaced by Takafumi Okada.

goat (jp) have become known for their musical style that combines minimalistic aesthetics of restrained timbres, textures, and forms, with intricately layered rhythmic patterns that include polymeteres and polyrhythms, with Boomkat describing them as "perhaps the tightest band in existence right now" owing to their highly rehearsed and virtuosic performances. Critics have compared goat (jp) and artists such as Steve Reich, Miles Davis, Mark Fell, Autechre, Ryoji Ikeda, Jon Hassell, and Beatrice Dillon, Meshuggah, Einstürzende Neubauten, and Throbbing Gristle.

According to an article in Liverary Mag, goat (jp) was prefigured by several projects that Hino was involved in during the late 2000s, including the math rock trio Talking Dead Goats, which consisted of Koshiro Hino (guitar), Atsumi Tagami (bass), and Tetsushi Nishikawa (drums), as well as the band bonanza with Yoshida Yasushi. According to an article in The Wire, Hino created goat after several years touring the Japanese underground circuit, and specifically after an epiphany upon encountering an exhibition by artist Tomoo Gokita, and a monochrome painting of intricate geometric patterns.

The band added '(jp)' to their name to avoid confusion with two other bands also called Goat from Greece and Sweden.

== Discography ==
- New Games (2013, Headz, Unknownmix)
- Rhythm & Sound (2015, Headz, Unknownmix)
- Joy in Fear (2023, Nakid)
- Without References / Cindy Van Acker (2025, Latency)
