= Olivetolic acid cyclase =

Enzyme

Identifiers
- EC no.: 4.4.1.26

Databases
- IntEnz: IntEnz view
- BRENDA: BRENDA entry
- ExPASy: NiceZyme view
- KEGG: KEGG entry
- MetaCyc: metabolic pathway
- PRIAM: profile
- PDB structures: RCSB PDB PDBe PDBsum
Search
- PMC: articles
- PubMed: articles
- NCBI: proteins

Olivetolic acid cyclase (EC 4.4.1.26, OAC) is an enzyme with systematic name 3,5,7-trioxododecanoyl-CoA CoA-lyase (2,4-dihydroxy-6-pentylbenzoate-forming). This enzyme catalyses the following chemical reaction

3,5,7-trioxododecanoyl-CoA → CoA + 2,4-dihydroxy-6-pentylbenzoate

This enzymes participates in the cannabinoids biosynthesis in the plant Cannabis sativa.
