= Gott (surname) =

Gott is a surname. Notable people with the name include:

- Benjamin Gott (1762–1840), British textile manufacturer
- Daniel Gott (1794–1864), U.S. Representative from New York
- Henry Gott (1730–1809), British gardener
- J. Richard Gott (born 1947), U.S. astrophysicist
- Jackson C. Gott (1829–1909), U.S. architect
- Jim Gott (born 1959), U.S. baseball player
- John Gott (bishop) (1830–1906) Vicar of Leeds and Bishop of Truro
- John William Gott (1866–1922), the last person in Britain to be sent to prison for blasphemy
- Karel Gott (1939–2019), Czech singer
- Larry Gott (born 1957), British musician
- Merryn Gott, New Zealand nursing academic specialising in palliative care
- Richard Gott (1938–2025), British journalist and historian
- Samuel Gott (1614–1671), MP for Winchelsea
- Trevor Gott (born 1992), American baseball player
- William Gott (1897–1942), known as "Strafer", British General of the Second World War in the Middle East
- William Gott (philanthropist) (1797–1863), British wool merchant and philanthropist

== See also ==
- Gotts, a surname
