= Goat Lake =

Goat Lake may refer to:

- Goat Lake (Sawtooth Wilderness), a glacial lake in Custer County, Idaho
- Goat Lake (Glacier County, Montana)
- Goat Lake (Snohomish County, Washington)

== See also ==
- Goat Haunt Lake, a lake in Glacier National Park, Montana
- Goat Rock Lake, a reservoir on the Chattahoochee River
