= Geranyl-pyrophosphate—olivetolic acid geranyltransferase =

Identifiers
- EC no.: 2.5.1.102

Databases
- IntEnz: IntEnz view
- BRENDA: BRENDA entry
- ExPASy: NiceZyme view
- KEGG: KEGG entry
- MetaCyc: metabolic pathway
- PRIAM: profile
- PDB structures: RCSB PDB PDBe PDBsum
Search
- PMC: articles
- PubMed: articles
- NCBI: proteins

Geranyl-pyrophosphate—olivetolic acid geranyltransferase (EC 2.5.1.102, GOT) is an enzyme with systematic name geranyl-diphosphate:olivetolate geranyltransferase. This enzyme catalyses the following chemical reaction

geranyl diphosphate + 2,4-dihydroxy-6-pentylbenzoate $\rightleftharpoons$ diphosphate + cannabigerolate

Part of the cannabinoids biosynthetic pathway of the plant Cannabis sativa.
