= Goats (novel) =

2000 novel by Mark Poirier

- First US edition
- Author: Mark Jude Poirier
- Language: English
- Publisher: Hyperion (US); Bllomsbury (UK)
- Publication date: 2000
- Publication place: United States
- Media type: Print
- Pages: 355
- ISBN: 0-7868-6680-2

Goats is a 2000 novel written by Mark Jude Poirier published by Hyperion with the strapline "Girls, ganga and goat-trekking"

== Plot introduction ==
The story is told from the perspective of two characters, Ellis and Goat Man. Ellis is fourteen and lives in Tucson, Arizona. His parents have split up and he lives with his mother Wendy, and Goat Man. Goat Man ostensibly looks after Wendy's garden and swimming pool and in return lives in the pool house. Goat Man is a goat-rearing marijuana enthusiast and introduced Ellis to the drug when he was eleven. Ellis now faces moving to Gates, an exclusive Pennsylvania prep school. The novel charts this dislocation and the impact it has on Ellis and those he leaves behind.

== Reception ==
- Tom Perrotta writing in The New York Times writes "Despite its occasional excesses, Goats is a hard-edged, clear-eyed coming-of-age novel shot through with unexpected flashes of tenderness."
- Publishers Weekly concludes, "With its low-key humor and idiosyncratic views on family, drug use and the modern American caste system, this is an engaging and perceptive debut".

== Film adaptation ==
The film rights were optioned by Christopher Neil in 2002. The movie was filmed in 2011 in Tucson and Pennsylvania, adapted by the author and directed by Neil. The film stars David Duchovny, Vera Farmiga, Ty Burrell, Justin Kirk, and Graham Phillips. The film premiered at the 2012 Sundance Film Festival and is currently seeking distribution.
