= GOAT (sports culture) =

Abbreviation of "greatest of all time"

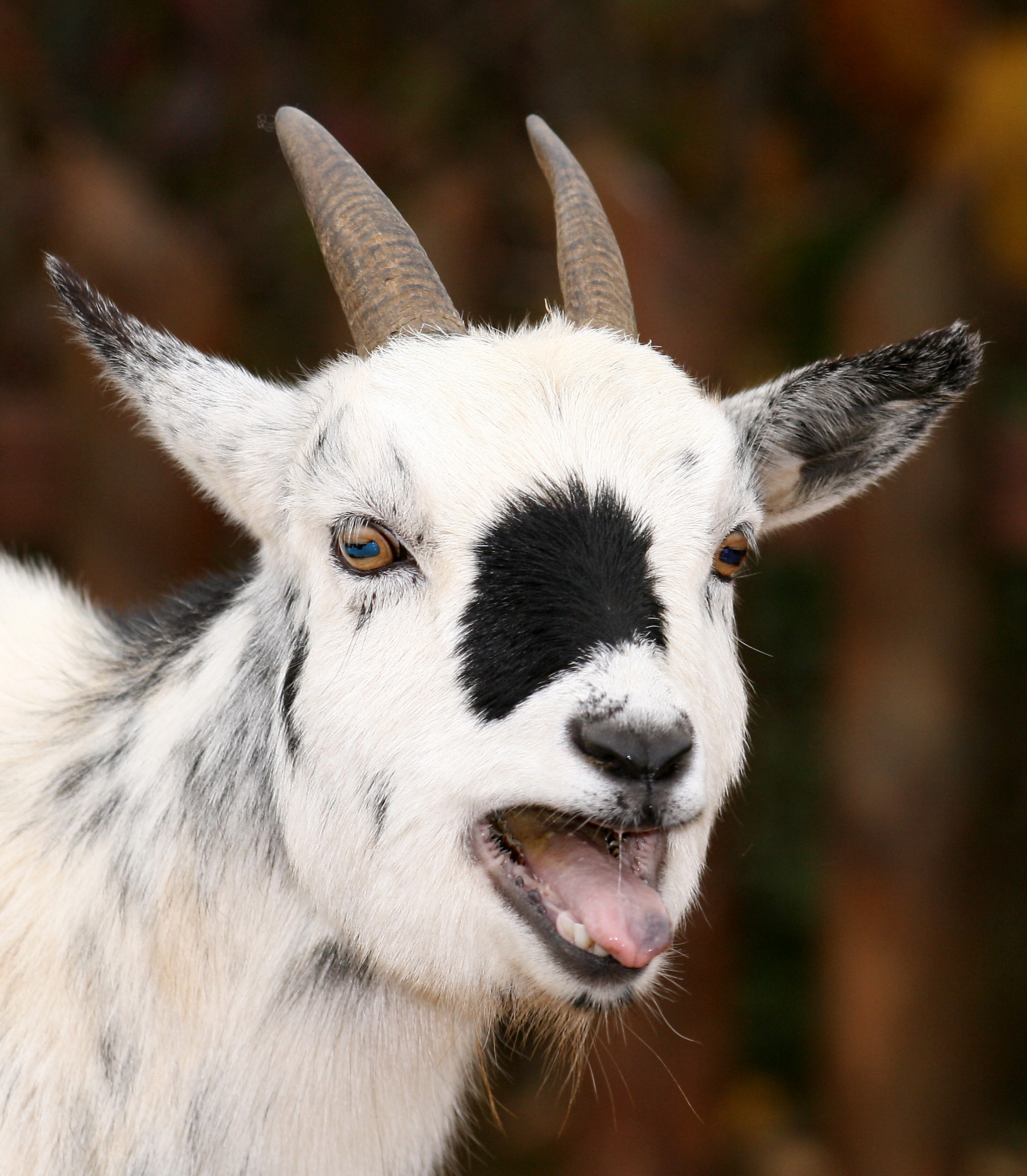
Due to the abbreviation for "Greatest of All Time" (GOAT), iconography of goats is sometimes used by sports media.

In sports culture, fans, commentators and participants have engaged in discussions regarding a sport's greatest of all time, often referred to by the abbreviation GOAT. The origins of the term as an acronym with positive connotations is often credited to the mid-20th century boxer Muhammad Ali. Its ubiquitous usage in sports conversations and debates was popularized in the 21st century.

The assessment of players as the greatest in a sport is often made by sportswriters and other members of the media based on differing criteria. Both objective measures, such as statistics and championships, as well as subjective commentary regarding an athlete's intangible traits are often considered. Sportswriters have noted issues with GOAT debates, including recency bias, as well as the improvement of nutrition and training over time, which some view as making it a challenge to compare players across eras. Many sports have no consensus for their single greatest all-time player. Cross-sport discussions have been held, also to no consensus. The assessment of a woman as a sport's greatest athlete or inclusion in cross-sports commentary as an all-time singular greatest athlete has been discussed.

Players themselves have also commented on GOAT conversations. Some have proclaimed themselves or a favorite player the GOAT; some refuse to include themselves in such conversations, highlighting other players' or their team's accomplishments; some dismiss the topic as misguided, foolish, or premature (for active players). When GOAT discussions happen, particularly online and in places with shareable images, imagery of goats (the animal) are often used.

== History and terminology ==
=== Etymology ===
The term GOAT (or G.O.A.T.) is an abbreviation of "greatest of all time". The term being written as an all caps or punctuated acronym is important, as the all lowercase term goat has been historically used in sports contexts to refer to "an athlete who failed, garishly, hilariously, and at the worst possible time". New York Daily News cartoonist Bill Gallo drew portraits of "goats" from each World Series game, depicting players with horns for ears. American sportswriter Frank Deford speculated that "the designation of the goat as the figure of ridicule derives from the medieval sign of the horn[s] for a cuckolded husband".

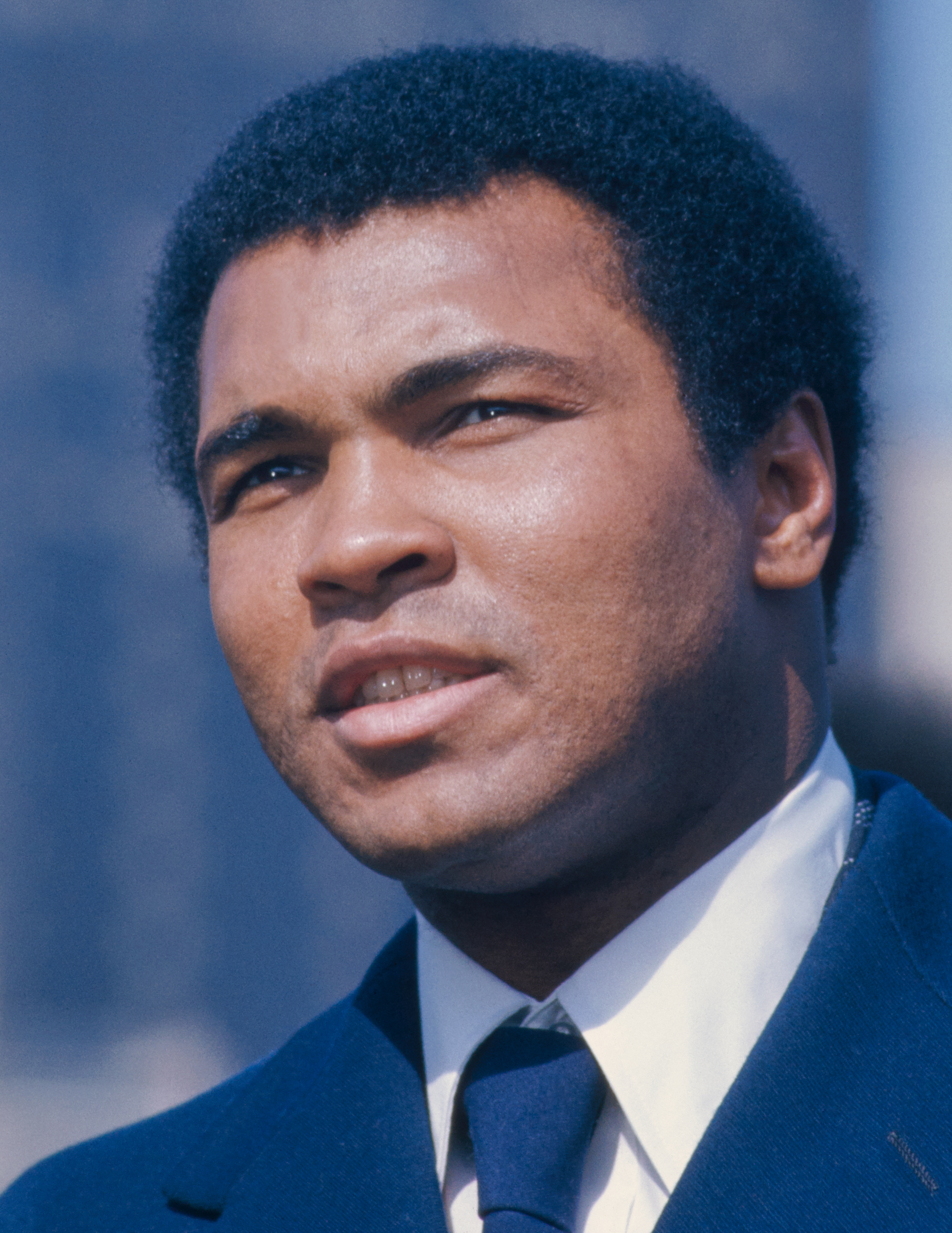
Boxer Muhammad Ali is credited with the term's origin.

As a positive connotation, the term traces its origins to boxer Muhammad Ali proclaiming himself "the greatest" multiple times during his career. Later, in 1992, Ali's wife Lonnie incorporated "Greatest of All Time, Inc." (or G.O.A.T. Inc.), a company intended to manage the then retired boxer's intellectual property for commercial purposes. While Ali has since been widely credited with popularizing the acronym, Kurt Streeter of The New York Times wrote "Some say GOAT's origins actually spring from a flamboyant, blond-tressed wrestler, George Wagner, who was known as Gorgeous George and who in the 1940s and '50s earned lavish paydays by turning trash talk into fine art". Streeter noted Ali drew inspiration from Wagner in his braggadocio. American rapper LL Cool J released the album G.O.A.T. in 2000, another early usage of the term as an acronym. The rapper has cited Ali as an inspiration, telling Rolling Stone in a 2016 interview that without Ali, "there would be no 'Mama Said Knock You Out', and the term G.O.A.T. would have never been coined".

Sportswriters' rankings and assessments of athletes as the greatest predate the current popularization of the term. For example, ESPN's SportsCentury panel in 1999 named Michael Jordan as the greatest athlete in North American sports of the 20th century. Sports Illustrated also named golfer Jack Nicklaus and multi-sport athlete Babe Didrikson Zaharias as the century's best individual male and female athletes, respectively. However, it was not until the 2000s and 2010s that the term GOAT gained traction in the general sports lexicon. Media coverage and fandom around professional sports leagues in the United States further popularized the term. In 2018, the term's pervasive usage in sports commentary prompted the Merriam-Webster Dictionary to recognize the term as an acronym and noun.

=== Related imagery and terms ===
The goat emoji as it appears on Twitter. On social media, athletes who are considered GOATs are often associated with the animal.

Since the popularization of term GOAT, athletes have begun to be associated with the animal. During training camp in 2017, Tom Brady's teammates on the New England Patriots celebrated his 40th birthday by bringing five live goats to the team's facility, representing each of his then five Super Bowl championships. The goat emoji is used in social media posts, often by general users but also by athletes themselves. The Wall Street Journal (WSJ) reviewed data covering a two-year period from 2017 to 2019, finding that "on any given day, there are roughly 40,000 tweets with the goat emoji". The WSJ also found that a significant sports moment was related to each of the top 20 single-day usages of the emoji, with Brady's win in Super Bowl LI leading to the highest single-day of over 330,000 tweets using the emoji, representing a 750% uptick. Twitter has implemented special goat-themed emojis to render for specific hashtags during sporting events. For the Summer Olympics in 2021, the Twitter hashtag for gymnast Simone Biles ("#SimoneBiles") was accompanied by an emoji of a goat in a sparkling red leotard. Biles herself has worn leotards emblazoned in rhinestones in the shape of a goat. After Ichiro Suzuki was inducted into the National Baseball Hall of Fame in 2025, the team he was most associated with during his playing career—the Seattle Mariners—released a "digital short" in which he is featured ushering a goat through the team's clubhouse. American basketball player Stephen Curry, often included by in the conversation for the GOAT at his position (point guard), served as a producer for Goat, an animated film released in 2026.

The phrase has also lent itself to the adjective goated, a slang description of someone or something considered to be the greatest of all time. Both GOAT and goated have since become used in non-sports contexts as well. (Note: Examples of non-sports-related usage of GOAT and goated include:) Jordan's name began to be used in the phrase "the Michael Jordan of", used to describe the greatest in a field. When awarding Jordan with the Presidential Medal of Freedom in 2016, U.S. President Barack Obama stated, "There is a reason you call someone 'the Michael Jordan of' [...] They know what you're talking about because Michael Jordan is the Michael Jordan of greatness". Writing for Bleacher Report, former National Basketball Association (NBA) player Steve Nash described the Portuguese footballer Cristiano Ronaldo as "the Michael Jordan of soccer". Sportswriters and veteran athletes have also used the variant phrase Young GOAT to refer to a young player they view as having great potential.

== GOAT assessments and discussions ==
Sportswriters and media members assess players based on various and wide-ranging criteria; this often includes objective measures, such as an athlete's individual statistical performance, championship victories, and career accolades relating to athletic merit and prowess. However, discussions on the greatest athletes of all time have also included subjective assessments of intangible traits, such as an athlete's "killer mentality", clutch, or competitive spirit. (Note: Examples of these objective and subjective measures being assessed or discussed as criteria for inclusion in "GOAT" conversations can be seen in the following sources:) Players' peaks or "prime" years, as well as their overall longevity are also common considerations. Adam Wells, for Bleacher Report, credited Czech–American tennis player Martina Navratilova for possessing both noteworthy "longevity and peak dominance". Voting for Reggie White over Lawrence Taylor as the greatest edge rusher in National Football League (NFL) history, reporter Tim McManus conceded that Taylor "flashed the brightest", but mentioned the former as "a relentless, unstoppable force for the better part of two decades" when explaining his choice. Commentary on a sport's GOAT has been made by sportswriters and athletes alike on both retired and active players, with the latter group often being discussed in speculative terms regarding their potential to eclipse a previous player's status as the GOAT, and analyzing whether the active player has achieved enough for genuine consideration. Speaking to the Times of India in 2018, former cricketer Kumar Sangakkara spoke on Virat Kohli, saying he had the potential to "become the greatest ever Indian batsman".

In the 2000s and 2010s, the term became pervasive in sports culture. This coincided with an increase in debates and discussions by sportswriters and media regarding the greatest athletes of all time. In particular, GOAT conversations in NBA circles have been notably polarizing and have influenced the increase of similar conversations in other sports. Oftentimes, there is not widespread consensus on a sport's singular greatest of all-time player, prompting sportswriters and media members to have broad "GOAT conversations", in which multiple potential candidates are given consideration and have their "cases" argued for. In 2012, ESPN's David Schoenfield, for example, listed eleven pitchers with "varying claims" to be greatest pitcher in the history of baseball. For these sports with less clear-cut scenarios, some writers object to there being any singular definitive "GOAT" altogether.

=== Recency bias, positional considerations, and cross-sport discussions ===
Additionally, the discussion is dynamic, with consensus about a sport's "GOAT" having changed over time in some sports. Sportswriters, participants, and spectators alike have noted that a particular sport's evolution, as well as improvements in sports overall relating to nutrition, equipment, and training, renders it difficult to compare players from different eras to each other. Yahoo! Sports columnist Dan Wetzel noted that recency bias favors more contemporary athletes. When selecting Roger Clemens over Walter Johnson as baseball's greatest pitcher of all time, Schoenfield wrote that "If I had to rank ... well, I give the edge to the guy from the more modern times". Writing about the greatest race horses of all time, NBC Bay Area's Scott Ross also noted this phenomenon, writing "It's likely that horse racing fans, like most people, favor those whom they saw with their own eyes when discussing the greatest of all time". Wetzel additionally examined how this recency bias affects the assessment of individual sports compared to team sports, writing that "Generally when it comes to sports, the newest phenom wins. Some of this is because of individual sports, where times are timeless [...] [Jesse] Owens fans can argue that if their guy enjoyed modern training and technology he would have been fastest, but that's hypothetical. Team sports are different. Subjectivity is everything. To hold on for long is nearly impossible". Although recency bias is a consideration, some sports have players from previous eras still widely considered the greatest; Zach Kram of The Ringer noted that in baseball, Babe Ruth "is now a mythical figure whose legend has never died, who remains discussed as the best in his sport's history despite playing before living memory".

Due to team sports having players take on specialized roles or positions, some sportswriters categorize the greatest players in these sports by position or skill. (Note: Examples of sportswriters considering a player's role, position, or specialization when assessing them in "GOAT" conversations can be seen in the following sources:) In team sports which require players to participate on both offense and defense, a two-way player refers to those who excel at both. However, for sports where this is not a requirement, being a two-way player can be rare, which has led to high-level multi-faceted players receiving high praise from some sportswriters. The aforementioned Ruth is often discussed as the greatest player in baseball for being able to dominate when both pitching and batting. Shohei Ohtani rose to prominence in the sport a century later for his two-way play and has since earned similar praise. Some individual sports also get discussed in specialized contexts, such as boxing, which has prompted writers to distinguish the sport's different weight divisions when assessing its greatest fighters. Even in sports with these considerations, some writers still aim to determine a sport's singular greatest athlete; in boxing and other combat sports, this can be seen in "pound for pound" rankings.

The issue of athletes competing in team sports versus those competing in individual sports has also been considered by those assessing the greatest athlete of all time, cross-sport. Cross-sport discussions have no clear consensus on a singular greatest athlete. Regarding this, while discussing the increasing prevalence of the topic and also citing the "craziness", "foolishness", and "fun" of GOAT conversations, Streeter issued four personal candidates for the GOAT in sports: baseball player Willie Mays, American football player Joe Montana, and tennis players Roger Federer and Serena Williams. There has also been commentary on female athletes' consideration for being a sport's singular greatest player, regardless of gender, or in the conversation for greatest athlete in cross-sport discussions.

=== Response from players ===
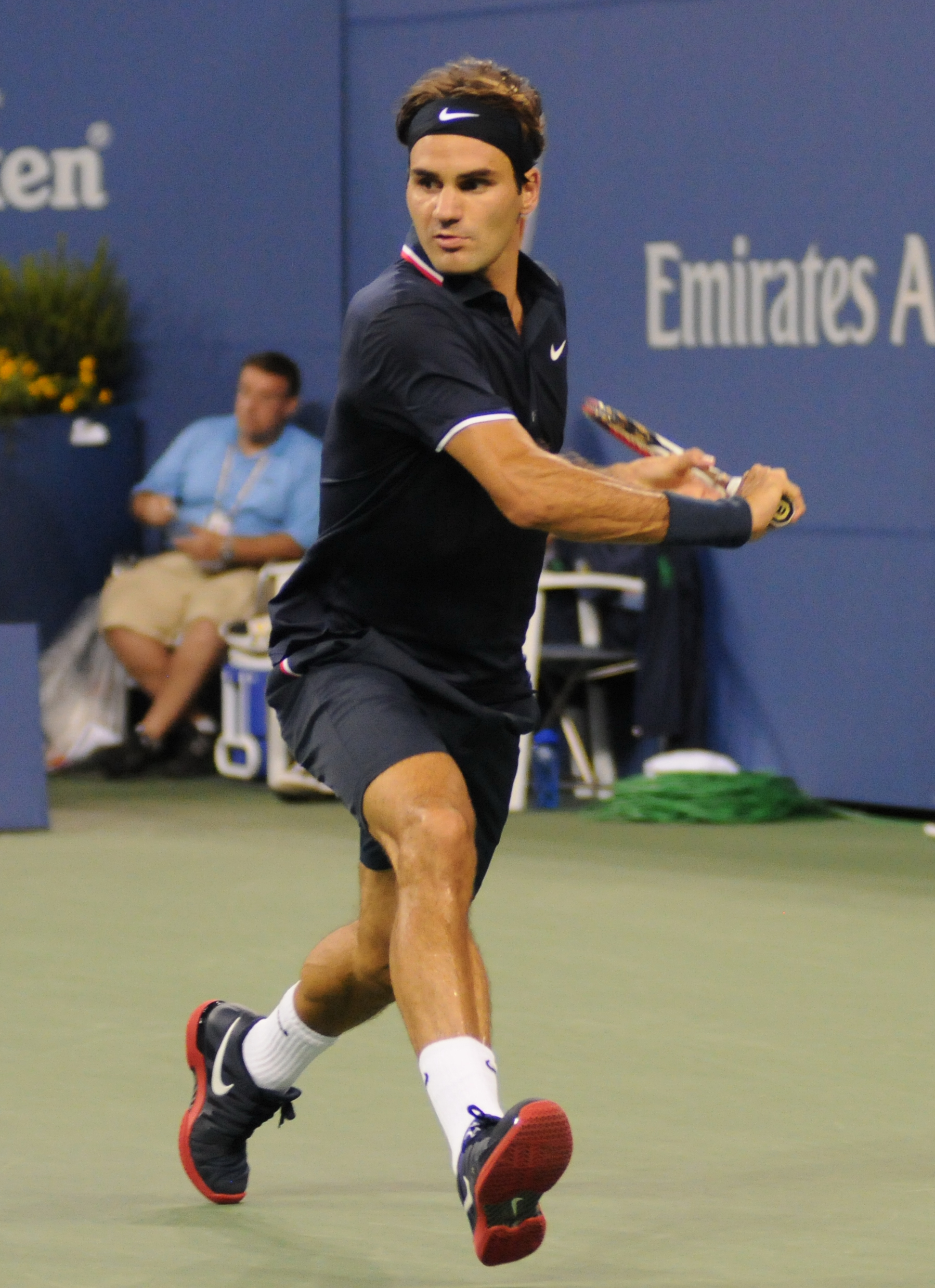
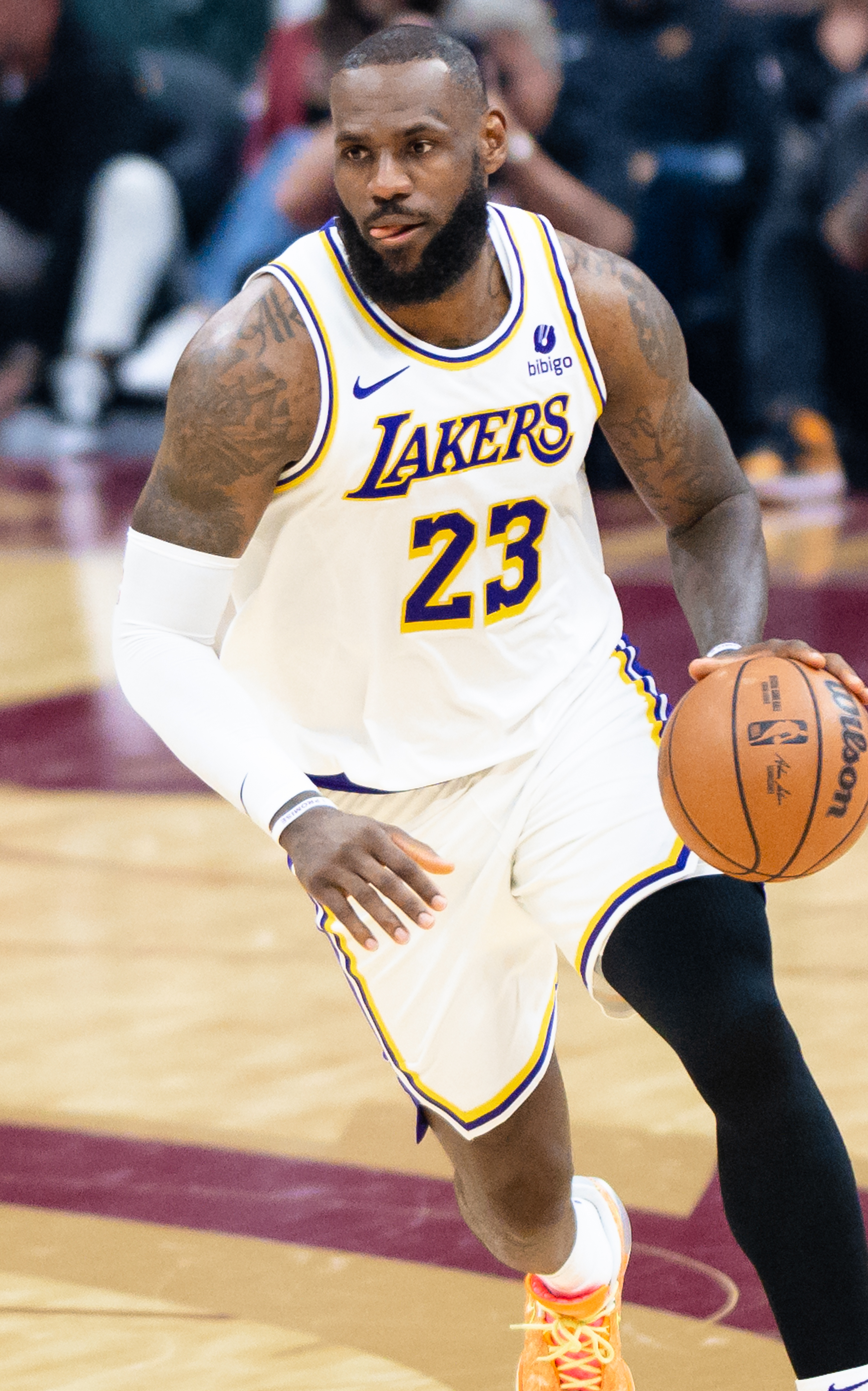
Athletes themselves have commented on GOAT debates, with varying opinions. Tennis player Roger Federer (left), often included in tennis GOAT debates, has called the topic "silly". Meanwhile, basketball player LeBron James (right) has proclaimed himself as his sport's GOAT.

Players themselves, both active and retired, have also weighed in GOAT debates. (Note: Examples of this include:) Some have called themselves the GOAT or worthy of being in the conversation. On winning the 2016 NBA Finals, LeBron James declared "that one right there made me the greatest player of all time". Pointing to his statistical output, Portuguese footballer Cristiano Ronaldo called himself the "most complete player to have existed", as well as the "best goal scorer in history", though stated he had respect for those who "like Messi, Pelé, Maradona," calling the discussion a matter of taste.

Meanwhile, others have declined to include themselves in the relevant discussions or refused to entertain reporter questions on the subject, instead opting to highlight others' candidacies. Finding it uncouth to include himself the conversation, Jordan pointed to great players from previous eras to his. In 2018, Formula One (F1) driver Lewis Hamilton similarly gave credit to earlier drivers Michael Schumacher and Juan Manuel Fangio, calling them the "GOAT" and "Godfather" of the sport, respectively.

Further still, some players find the topic absurd or misguided in the discussion of their sport. In an article for Newsweek, retired NBA player Kareem Abdul-Jabbar opined that the topic "runs through the media like a nasty STD", added that "it's like asking, how big is the horn on a unicorn?", and bemoaned James' self-proclamation as basketball's GOAT. Federer said the topic lends itself to "good conversation" and "fun debate", but called it "silly", stating "I think it's a phenomenon of (social) media. Everybody calling each other 'GOAT.' 'GOAT.' 'GOAT.' 'GOAT.' 'GOAT.' 'GOAT.' I'm like, Come on, OK? There cannot be possibly that many 'GOATs'".

== See also ==
- 100 Greatest of All Time
- 100 Greatest NHL Players
- Australian rugby league's 100 greatest players
- Big Three (tennis)
- Comparison of top chess players throughout history
- FIFA 100
- Messi–Ronaldo rivalry
- Mythical national championship
- NASCAR's 75 Greatest Drivers
- The Top 100: NFL's Greatest Players
- TSN Top 50 CFL Players
