= Gott =

Gott (German: God) may refer to:

- Gott (surname), including a list of people with the name
- Gott, Argyll and Bute, a location in Scotland
- Gott, Shetland, a village in Tingwall, Shetland, Scotland
- Gottschalks, whose stock symbol on the Pink Sheets was GOTT but now is GOTTQ

== See also ==
- List of Germanic deities § Gods
- GOT (disambiguation)
