= Munger (surname) =

Munger is a surname. Notable people with the name include:

- Alvah R. Munger (1842–1928), American politician and farmer
- Charlie Munger (1924–2023), American investment manager
- Clarissa Munger Badger (1806–1889), American botanical illustrator
- Edith Munger (1865–1945), American bird conservationist
- George Munger (disambiguation), several people
  - George Munger (American football) (1909–1994) football player and coach for whom the George Munger Award is named
  - George Munger (artist) (1771–1825), engraver known for portraits and miniatures
  - George Munger (soldier) (18??–), Union Army corporal who helped capture Jefferson Davis
  - George G. Munger (1828–1895), American lawyer and politician
- Gilbert Munger (1837–1903), American landscape painter
- Katy Munger (born 1956), American writer
- Leslie Munger (born 1956), American politician and business executive
- Michael Munger (born 1958), American economist and libertarian candidate
- Philip Munger (born 1946), American composer, music educator, and political blogger
- Red Munger (1918–1996), American baseball player
- Robert S. Munger (1854–1923), American businessman, inventor and philanthropist
- Rudolf Münger (1862–1929), Swiss painter
- Theodore T. Munger (1830–1910), American Congregational clergyman
- Thomas Charles Munger (1861–1941), American judge
- Thornton T. Munger (1883 – 1975), American research scientist
- William Henry Munger (1845–1915), American judge
- Willard Munger (1911–1999), American politician

== See also ==
- Monger (surname)
