= Armchair revolutionary =

Often-pejorative term

Armchair revolutionary (or armchair activist and armchair socialist) is a description, often pejorative, of a speaker or writer who professes radical aims without taking any action to realize them, as if pontificating "from the comfort of the armchair". The term is one of a family of "armchair experts" or "armchair theorists", such as the armchair warrior or armchair general.

== Examples ==
In 1937, Nikolai Berdyaev wrote: "After years of living in Western Europe, Plekhanov became entirely a Western and of a very rationalist sort, fairly cultured, although his culture was not of the highest kind; more of an armchair revolutionary than a practical one. He could be a leader of a Marxist school of thought, but he could not be a leader of a revolution; that was made clear at the time of the revolution".

Columnist Julie Burchill highlighted the relative level of energy exhibited in this lede: "During a long hard winter, nothing warms the cold blood of the Western armchair revolutionary more than the sight of a bunch of attractive dark-skinned people out on the streets having a right old revolution".

Left Communists have frequently been accused of armchair practices by the more Marxist-Leninist wings of Marxist movements. Amadeo Bordiga, a notable Italian left communist, particularly has been ascribed this title due to his frequent critique of the Soviet economic model and constant criticism of Marxist-Leninist nations.

== In culture ==
The Guardian used the cliche in this headline: "We're a nation of armchair activists—and that's OK, says Bridget Christie".

William Graham titled his travel book Latin America: Notes from an Armchair Revolutionary.

In December 2014, The BMJ published a study, possibly satirical in intent and described as "lighthearted" in NHS Choices, with the purported purpose of determining how political affiliation correlates with literal physical activity levels. The study's stated conclusion was that literal "armchair socialists" as a class do not exist as holders of political views toward either end of the spectrum (left or right) tend to be more physically active than political centrists.

== Related idioms ==
- Armchair quarterback, a person who believes they are more qualified to give advice on a sport than the players of that particular sport
- Armchair warrior
- Back-seat driver, a person who does not participate in the control of a vehicle, but actively criticizes or comments on the driver's actions
- Chickenhawk, an American term for an actively militaristic person who avoids actual military service
- Kathedersozialisten (socialists of the lectern), a comparable construction in German, referring to a university chair
- Champagne socialist, rich people living a luxurious life who claim to have leftist views and to protect the poor from capitalism.
- Keyboard warrior
- Monday morning quarterback
- Slacktivist
- Virtue signalling, an insincere display of pro-mainstream views and intentions in order to gain social approval.
