= Mounger =

Mounger is an American surname. It is likely a variant spelling of Manger. It is found most prevalently in Texas, Tennessee, and Massachusetts.

Notable people with the surname include:

- Christian Mounger, American artist
- Henry Mounger (1872-1928), American politician and lawyer
- Milton U. Mounger (1867-1911), American politician

== See also ==
- Monger (surname)
- Munger (surname)
