= Monger =

Monger may refer to:

== Traders ==
- Peddler, a traveling vendor of goods
- a merchant dealer, such as:
  - Costermonger, a street seller of fruit and vegetables; in Britain also general (synonym) peddler
  - Cheesemonger, a specialist seller of cheeses
  - Fellmonger, a merchant of hides and skins
  - Fishmonger, a wholesaler or retailer of raw fish and seafood
  - Fruitmonger, a seller of fruit
  - Ironmonger, a supplier of iron goods, or in the modern sense a hardware store
- Whoremonger, a sex worker's client

== Other uses ==
- Monger (surname)
- Galup, formerly Lake Monger, a large urban wetland in Perth, Western Australia
- Monger Lake, a watershed of the Ha! Ha! River in Quebec
- Mongers Lake, a lake in Western Australia

== See also ==
- Fearmongering, spreading of frightening rumours to purposely arouse fear
- Warmonger (disambiguation)
- Mongar, Bhutan
- Mongar District, Bhutan
