= Armchair warrior =

Pejorative term that alludes to verbally fighting from the comfort of one's living room

Armchair warrior is a pejorative term that refers to people who encourages violence without taking action themselves. It describes activities such as speaking out in support of a war, battle, or fight.

Typical "armchair warrior" activities include advocating sending troops to settle a conflict, lobbying to keep defense jobs to make outdated military equipment as part of the military-industrial complex, or to make political messages on radio or television talk shows in favor of using armed forces in a conflict over trying diplomatic channels. The term is one of a family of "armchair experts" or "armchair theorists", such as the armchair revolutionary or armchair general.

An early example of the term "armchair warrior" appeared in the 1963 Twilight Zone episode No Time Like the Past, in which a time traveler to the late 1800s uses the term in a speech directed towards a banker who is calling for sending young soldiers to fight a war against American Indians. The show's director, Rod Serling, had received a Purple Heart for injuries incurred while serving as a paratrooper in World War II.

This concept differs from "slacktivism" in that no action needs to be done by an "armchair warrior" beyond stating a point of view versus an act to give the appearance of making a difference from a "slacktivist". It is more of a variation of "chickenhawk", which was originally a slang term used during the Vietnam War to describe a superior officer that was not on the frontlines.

Don Henley refers to "armchair warriors" in his song "The End of the Innocence".

== See also ==
- Keyboard warrior
