= Irfan Hafiz =

Sri Lankan writer, content creator, author, motivational speaker

- Born: 1981; Matara, Southern Province, Sri Lanka
- Died: 25 July 2018 (aged 36–37); Beruwala, Sri Lanka
- Other name: Differently-abled keyboard warrior
- Education: Zahira College, Colombo
- Occupations: writer, content creator, author, motivational speaker
- Notable work: Silent Struggle, Moments of Merriment, Silent Thoughts

Irfan Hafiz (1981 – 25 July 2018) was a Sri Lankan writer, author, content creator, motivational speaker, social media influencer and internet personality. He was famously dubbed and nicknamed as a differently abled keyboard warrior in the social circles.

== Biography ==
Irfan was born in 1981 in the Southern Province of Sri Lanka, in Matara. He was born as the third child in his family of eight children. His father Hafiz Issadeen served as a principal at a school and his father also served as an editor of Arumbu educational magazine.

He was detected to have been diagnosed with a rare disorder called Duchenne muscular dystrophy at the age of four. It significantly impacted his childhood and he started using a wheelchair at the age of twelve. His parents faced tough challenge on how to help him out by forming a recovery process and their situation was further aggravated when neighbours and relatives frequently paid visit to check upon him ever since he was diagnosed with the Duchenne muscular dystrophy. His parents were literally worried about his deteriorating physical health conditions which worsened as the days progressed and as a result, he dropped out of schooling at a young age, as he could not properly focus and concentrate on his studies. He attended the Zahira College, Colombo after his family moved to Beruwala. He studied until the 5th grade without advancing further, thereby abandoning the studies due to the precarious health conditions derailing his academic participation. His father Hafiz Issadeen took a firm bold decision to prematurely retire from the service in order to take care of his son's health. His father researched specifically about the cause of disease and he concluded that the disease was incurable, but took necessary remedies to confront the challenges pertaining to the disease conditions.

He spent the majority of his life under bed rest in a life support ventilator, as his entire body lost mobility and he battled his way out due to breathing related suffocation issues which he went through after the age of eighteen. It was only after turning eighteen, he endured further life threatening tragical circumstances when his entire muscular system was collapsed unexpectedly, forcing him to live the remaining lifetime lying in bed, as he was unable to move due to the deteriorating physical conditions. He only had some sort of strength as a glimmer of hope, when he only had one finger to move and utilise while the other organs in his body had been paralyzed, largely restraining himself from engaging in productive activities on a day to day basis. He used the sole index finger as an inevitable option for the latter part of his life, as his life trajectory was restricted and confined to just four corners of the wall in a bedroom.

== Career ==
He had taught himself to learn, read, write, type and understand the global lingua franca language of English despite confronting with difficult physical conditions. He eventually used his only active finger to type and publish three books through his Apple iPhone. He published three books titled Silent Struggle, Moments of Merriment and Silent Thoughts while lying in bed. His books became renowned for their uniqueness for being typically written through an iPhone and his books became bestsellers, garnering him critical acclaim, fame and recognition. His book Moments of Merriment which was a massive compilation of his short story collection with an estimated word count tally of over 40,000 had nearly taken him a year to successfully complete. He was supposed to publish his fourth book, but the plan was shelved due to his untimely death.

Through online platforms such as Facebook, he advocated for people suffering from life tragedies to push themselves going forward overcoming roadblocks and obstacles, by taking cue out of his personal life through delivering motivational content about indicating the sequence of life changing events which took place during his lifetime ever since he was diagnosed with Duchenne muscular dystrophy. He shared his personal tragedies incorporating with the motivational stories in an insightful manner to the viewers in his official Facebook page under the name Silent Fighter in an attempt to revive the subject of mental health awareness. He eventually received the nickname "keyboard warrior" for his thought provoking ideas he shared on a daily basis while lying in bed, to uplift the spirits of people suffering from various ailments through online platforms.

Popular Israeli-Arab blogger Nas Daily covered a special segment depicting the life trajectory and legacy of Irfan in his official Facebook page and Nas also heaped praise on him by indicating that he had never seen an inspiring person of Irfan’s calibre in his lifetime.

== Death ==
He died on 25 July 2018 at the age of 37, after being bedridden predominantly for a duration of nineteen years.
