= Off the verandah =

Phrase in anthropology

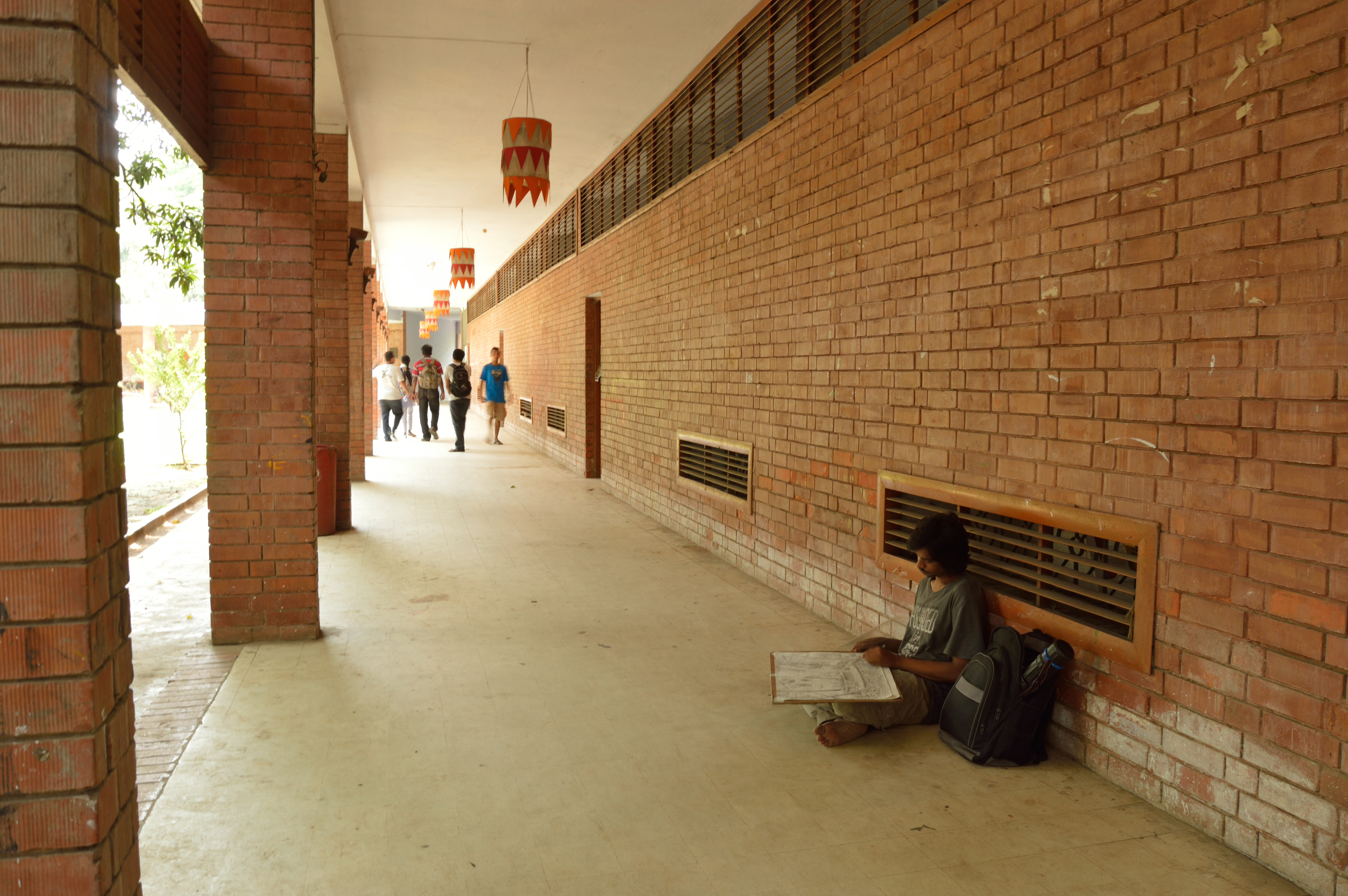
A student sitting on a veranda at University of Dhaka, Bangladesh, 2015

Off the verandah (alt. spelling off the veranda; longer, come down off the verandah) is a phrase often attributed to anthropologist Bronisław Malinowski, who stressed the need for fieldwork enabling the researcher to experience the everyday life of his subjects along with them. In this context, it is also interpreted as criticism of armchair theorizing.

== Origin ==
While often used to describe Malinowski's message and occasionally attributed directly to him, the origins of the phrase are unclear, and it has also been attributed to Ian Jarvie's criticism of Malinowski's idea in his 1964 The Revolution in Anthropology, in which he paraphrased Malinowski's message to his followers:

Soon the voices of the swelling mass of students could be heard ... "Father ... show us how we may come to do so" they beseeched Malinowski ... Malinowski heeded their plea. Back came the reply, the second slogan: "Come down off the verandah, come out of your studies and join the people". Translated this reads "do not sit spinning theories like spider webs on the verandah ... go down among the people, get to know them ..."

== Significance ==
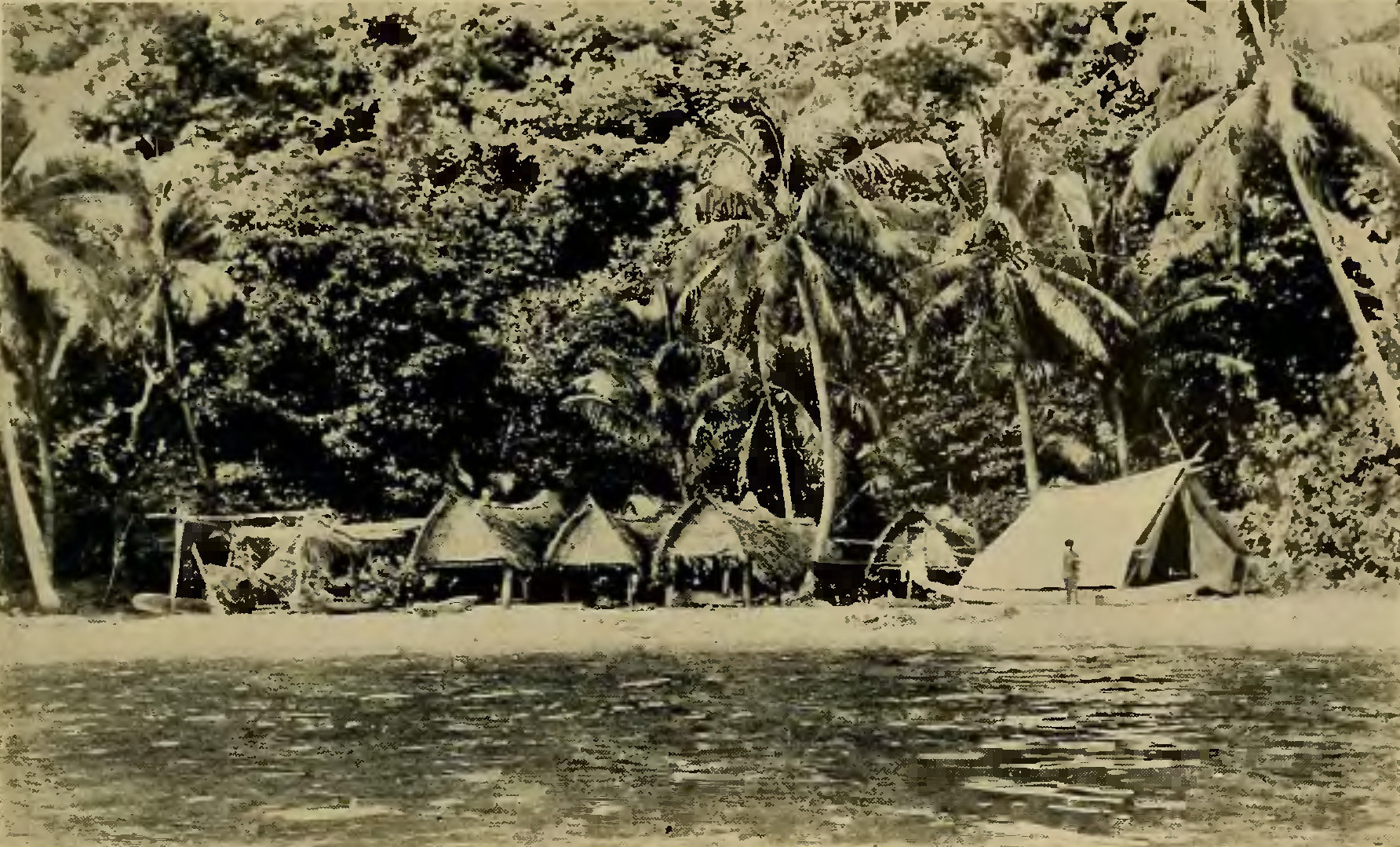
A photo (Plate I) from Malinowski's Argonauts of the Western Pacific (1922), showing the native village as well as Malinowski's tent.

The phrase refers to the argument promoted by anthropologist Bronisław Malinowski who stressed the need for fieldwork enabling the researcher to experience the everyday life of his subjects alongside them. Malinowski emphasised the importance of detailed participant observation and argued that anthropologists must have daily contact with their informants if they are to adequately record the "imponderabilia of everyday life" that are so important to understanding a different culture. In this context it is also interpreted as criticism of armchair theorizing.

Judith Okely commenting on modern anthropology, wrote that "Long out of the armchair, [anthropologists] have moved down from the verandah", also noting that the early 19th-century "armchair anthropologists ... lived off the material brought back by Westerners who had travelled to distant places". She also distinguishes the group of "verandah anthropologists", who visited new places, but did not learn the language of the people they observed, depending on interpreters and rarely interacting with their subjects. Here, Malinowski's proverbial innovation was moving "from verandah to tent, which he pitched in the centre of the village".

Indeed, Malinowski in his pioneering (Note: Malinowski is said to have "gone native" around 1915–1916; another American scholar, John Layard, did so around the same time as well (in 1917). Chris Gosden wrote that "Malinowski's claim to have moved anthropological fieldwork from the verandah into the village has considerable truth to it, even if this is not the whole truth [as] there is much more continuity between himself and his predecessors than Malinowski allowed for". Max Gluckman noted that Malinowski developed the idea of fieldwork, but it originated with Alfred Cort Haddon in England and Franz Boas in the United States. Robert G. Burgess concluded that "it is Malinowski who is usually credited with being the originator of intensive anthropological field research".) research set up a tent in the middle of villages he studied, in which he lived for extended periods of times, weeks or months. He also learned the language of the natives. His argument was shaped by his initial experiences as an anthropologist in the mid-1910s in Australia and Oceania, where during his first field trip he found himself grossly unprepared for it, due to not knowing the language of the people he set to study, nor being able to observe their daily customs sufficiently (during that initial trip, he was lodged with a local missionary and just made daily trips to the village, an endeavour which became increasingly difficult once he lost his translator). His pioneering decision to subsequently immerse himself in the life of the natives represents his solution to this problem, and was the message he addressed to new, young anthropologists, aiming to both improve their experience and allow them to produce better data. Because of the impact of his argument, Malinowski is sometimes credited with inventing the field of ethnography. The phrase is also the title of André Singer's 1986 documentary about Malinowski's work. (Note: "Bronislaw Malinowski: Off the Veranda." 52 minutes. Films Media Group, 1985.)

Malinowski's idea has, however, met with some criticism. Ian Jarvie described himself as "strongly dissenting" to it; and argued that it was Malinowski's attack on James George Frazer school of fieldwork, an attack that was not just about methodology but about philosophy, in the form of propagating the functionalist view, and focusing on "ritual rather than the belief". The relation between Frazer – an influential early anthropologist, nonetheless described as the classic armchair scholar – and Malinowski was complex; Frazer was one of Malinowski's mentors and supporters, and his The Golden Bough (1890) is credited with inspiring young Malinowski to become an anthropologist. At the same time, Malinowski was critical of Frazer from his early days, and it has been suggested that what he learned from Frazer was not "how to be an anthropologist" but "how not to do anthropology".

== See also ==
- A priori and a posteriori
- Emic and etic
