= Footprints Network =

Australian non-profit organization

The Footprints Network
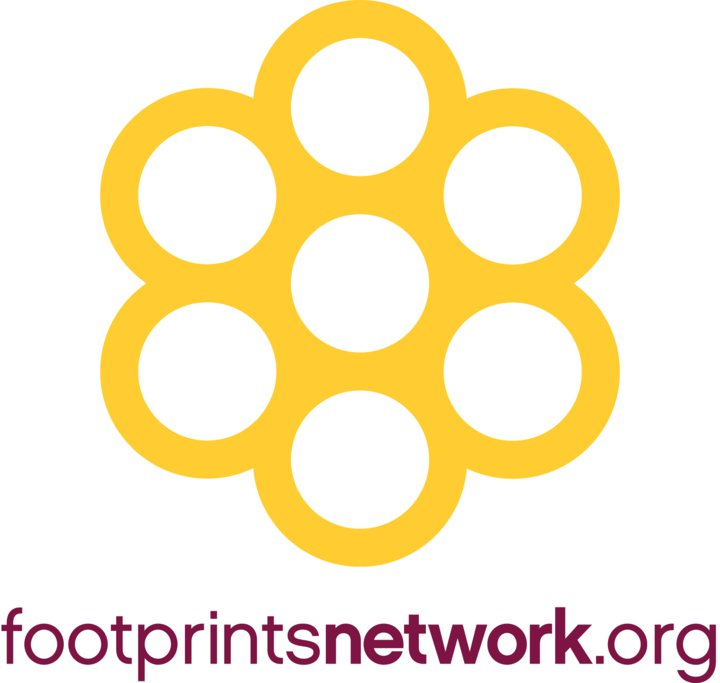
- Founded: 2004
- Founder: Simion Monk, worldnomads.com
- Location: New South Wales, Australia
- Region served: Global
- Method: Micro-donations
- Key people: Simon Monk, founder and President; Aine Leonard, Treasurer; Alicia Crosariol, Co-Secretary
- Website: www.footprintsnetwork.org

The Footprints Network is a non-profit Australian organisation that operates an online charity payment aggregator. It raises money from micro-donations collected as part of other e-commerce transactions. Founded by Worldnomads.com in 2005, it derives its operational funding from corporate social responsibility programs.

== History ==
Following the 2004 Indian Ocean earthquake and tsunami, the original developers at Worldnomads created a program with a checkbox on a single web site, which invited customers to add two Australian dollars donation a charity during the purchase of a travel insurance policy. Within a few months this had raised $50,000. The program was later re-engineered so that people could donate to location-specific, project based initiatives, which improved collections. As of 2018 the group has raised over $4 million.

An application programming interface (API) was developed making, the technology freely available for e-businesses to integrate the program into their web sites.

The optional donations are made specifically to projects for which the customer chooses to donate, and the customers are sent optional updates about the progress of the projects following the transaction. The primary charities collected for include Oxfam Australia, The Fred Hollows Foundation, and Water Aid Australia.

== Projects ==
As of January 2019, the group had completed over 200 projects, and had eleven open projects. Open projects, once completely funded are put into the category of funded projects, for which the funding process has been completed and are ready to become operational. As of January 2015, eleven projects had been completely funded by the organization and were on the verge of being operational.
