= Givology =

- Founded: April 10, 2008; 18 years ago
- Method: Peer-to-peer microphilanthropy
- Members: 3,843
- Employees: 0
- Website: http://www.givology.org

Givology.org is an online peer-to-peer donation platform which allows users to browse and sponsor students and education projects in the developing world. Founded in 2008 by undergraduate students at the University of Pennsylvania, Givology currently has 501(c)(3) tax-exempt status.
