= Chickenhawk (politics) =

Derogatory term for a political hypocrite

Chickenhawk (chicken hawk or chicken-hawk) is a political term used in the United States to describe a person who is a war hawk yet actively avoids or avoided military service when of draft age. In political usage, chickenhawk is a compound of chicken (meaning 'coward') and hawk from war hawk (meaning 'someone who advocates war'). Generally, the implication is that chickenhawks lack bravery to participate in war themselves, preferring to ask others to support, fight, and die in an armed conflict.

== History ==
The term war hawk developed early in American history as a term for one who advocates war. On one episode of the American television show Rowan & Martin's Laugh-In that aired in 1970, Dan Rowan made the following joke:

On the Vietnam issue, I have a friend who says he's a chickenhawk. He wants us to fight on to victory, but to do it without him.

Previously, the term war wimp was sometimes used, coined during the Vietnam War by Congressman Andrew Jacobs, a Marine veteran of the Korean War, to describe "someone who promotes waging war or building up the tools of war but hid behind a college deferment or suddenly came up lame when the draft board whistled."

The 1983 bestselling book Chickenhawk was a memoir by Robert Mason about his service in the Vietnam War, in which he was a helicopter pilot. Mason used the word as a compound oxymoron to describe both his fear of combat ("chicken") and his attraction to it ("hawk").

== Commentary ==
James Fallows identifies the rise of chickenhawks with the distancing of the American public from the military. He says that while most Americans had experience with the military by the end of World War II, having either served or known people who had, "now the American military is exotic territory to most of the American public." He cites examples of popular media such as Apocalypse Now and The Hurt Locker as many Americans' exposure to the military.

Critics of the term chickenhawk argue that the term is used as a form of whataboutism in place of arguments against military action. Matthew Yglesias describes it as "a species of hypocrisy charge, a tempting rhetorical ploy that in practice proves almost nothing."

Paul Wolfowitz, John Bolton, Donald Trump, Dick Cheney, George W Bush, Newt Gingrich, Rush Limbaugh, Mitt Romney, Bill Kristol, and Ted Nugent are modern examples of those being called chicken-hawks by critics.

== Research ==
According to a 2014 study, leaders who had military backgrounds but no combat experience were most likely to initiate conflicts and wars. The study was based on the life experiences of over 2,500 military leaders from 1875 to 2004. In addition to military leaders without combat experience, the other group seen as likely to cause wars was former rebel leaders.

== See also ==
- Armchair general
- Armchair revolutionary
- Armchair warrior
