= Slacktivism =

Pejorative term for "feel-good" activist measures

The like button used on Facebook, a popular slacktivist tool

Slacktivism (a blend of slacker and activism) is the practice of supporting a political or social cause by means such as social media or online petitions, characterized as involving very little effort or commitment. Additional forms of slacktivism include engaging in online activities such as liking, sharing or tweeting about a cause on social media, signing an Internet petition, copying and pasting a status or message in support of the cause, sharing specific hashtags associated with the cause, or altering one's profile photo or avatar on social network services to indicate solidarity.

Critics of slacktivism suggest that it fails to make a meaningful contribution to an overall cause because a low-stakes show of support, whether online or offline, is superficial, ineffective, draws off energy that might be used more constructively, and serves as a substitute for more substantive forms of activism rather than supplementing them, and might, in fact, be counter-productive. As groups increasingly use social media to facilitate civic engagement and collective action, proponents of slacktivism have pointed out that it can lead to engagement and help generate support for lesser-known causes.

== Use of the term ==
The term was coined by Dwight Ozard and Fred Clark in 1995 at the Cornerstone Festival. The term was meant to shorten the phrase slacker activism, which refers to bottom-up activities by young people to affect society on a small, personal scale (such as planting a tree, as opposed to participating in a protest). The term originally had a positive connotation.

Monty Phan, staff writer for Newsday, was an early user of the term in his 2001 article titled, "On the Net, 'Slacktivism'/Do-Gooders Flood In-Boxes."

An early example of using the term "slacktivism" appeared in Barnaby Feder's article in The New York Times called "They Weren't Careful What They Hoped For." Feder quoted anti-scam crusader Barbara Mikkelson of Snopes, who described activities such as those listed above. "It's all fed by slacktivism ... the desire people have to do something good without getting out of their chair."

Another example of the term "Slacktivism" appeared in Evgeny Morozov's book, Net Delusion: The Dark Side of Internet Freedom (2011). In it, Morozov relates slacktivism to the Colding-Jørgensen experiment. In 2009, a Danish psychologist named Anders Colding-Jørgensen created a fictitious Facebook group as part of his research. On the page, he posted an announcement suggesting that the Copenhagen city authorities would be demolishing the historical Stork Fountain. Within the first day, 125 Facebook members joined Colding-Jørgensen's. The number of fans began to grow at a staggering rate, eventually reaching 27,500. Morozov argues the Colding-Jørgensen experiment reveals a key component of slacktivism: "When communication costs are low, groups can easily spring into action." Clay Shirky similarly characterized slacktivism as "ridiculously easy group forming".

== Criticism of slacktivism ==
Various people and groups express doubts about the value and effectiveness of slacktivism. Particularly, some skeptics argue that it entails an underlying assumption that all problems can be seamlessly fixed using social media, and while this may be true for local issues, slacktivism could prove ineffective for solving global predicaments. A 2009 NPR piece by Morozov asked whether "the publicity gains gained through this greater reliance on new media [are] worth the organizational losses that traditional activist entities are likely to suffer, as ordinary people would begin to turn away from conventional (and proven) forms of activism."

Criticism of slacktivism often involves the idea that internet activities are ineffective, and/or that they prevent or lessen political participation in real life. However, as many studies on slacktivism relate only to a specific case or campaign, it is difficult to find an exact percentage of slacktivist actions that reach a stated goal. Furthermore, many studies also focus on such activism in democratic or open contexts, whereas the act of publicly liking, RSVPing or adopting an avatar or slogan as one's profile picture can be a defiant act in authoritarian or repressive countries.

Micah White has argued that although slacktivism is typically the easiest route to participation in movements and changes, the novelty of online activism wears off as people begin to realize that their participation created virtually no effect, leading people to lose hope in all forms of activism.

Canadian journalist Malcolm Gladwell, in his October 2010 New Yorker article, lambasted those who compare social media "revolutions" with actual activism that challenges the status quo ante. He argued that today's social media campaigns cannot compare with activism that takes place on the ground, using the Greensboro sit-ins as an example of what real, high-risk activism looks like.

A 2011 study looking at college students found only a small positive correlation between those who engage online in politics on Facebook with those who engage off of it. Those who did engage only did so by posting comments and other low forms of political participation, helping to confirm the slacktivism theoretical model.

The New Statesman has analyzed the outcomes of ten most-shared petitions and listed all of them as unsuccessful.

Brian Dunning, in his 2014 podcast, Slacktivism: Raising Awareness, argues that the internet activities that slacktivism is associated with are a waste of time at their best and at their worst are ways to "steal millions of dollars from armchair activists who are persuaded to donate actual money to what they're told is some useful cause." He says that most slacktivism campaigns are "based on bad information, bad science, and are hoaxes as often as not".

He uses the Kony 2012 campaign as an example of how slacktivism can be used as a way to exploit others. The movie asked viewers to send money to the filmmakers rather than African law enforcement. Four months after the movie was released, Invisible Children, the charity who created the film, reported $31.9 million of gross receipts. The money in the end was not used to stop Kony, but rather to make another movie about stopping Kony. Dunning goes as far as to say that raising awareness of Kony was not even useful, as law enforcement groups had been after him for years.

Dunning does state that today, however, slacktivism is generally more benign. He cites Change.org as an example. The site is full of hundreds of thousands of petitions. A person signing one of these online petitions may feel good about himself, but these petitions are generally not binding nor do they lead to any major change. Dunning suggests that before donating, or even "liking" a cause, one should research the issue and the organization to ensure nothing is misattributed, exaggerated, or wrong.

An example of a campaign against slacktivism is the advertisement series "Liking Isn't Helping" created by the international advertisement company Publicis Singapore for a relief organization, Crisis Relief Singapore (CRS). This campaign features images of people struggling or in need, surrounded by many people giving a thumbs up with the caption "Liking isn't helping". Though the campaign lacked critical components that would generate success, it made viewers stop and think about their activism habits and question the effect that slacktivism really has.

== Defense of slacktivism ==
In response to Gladwell's criticism of slacktivism in the New Yorker (see above), journalist Leo Mirani argues that he might be right if activism is defined only as sit-ins, taking direct action, and confrontations on the streets. However, if activism is about arousing awareness of people, changing people's minds, and influencing opinions across the world, then the revolution will indeed be "tweeted", "hashtagged", and "YouTubed." In a March 2012 Financial Times article, referring to efforts to address the ongoing violence related to the Lord's Resistance Army, Matthew Green wrote that the slacktivists behind the Kony 2012 video had "achieved more with their 30-minute video than battalions of diplomats, NGO workers and journalists have since the conflict began 26 years ago."

Although slacktivism has often been used pejoratively, some scholars point out that activism within the digital space is a reality. These scholars suggest that slacktivism may have its deficiencies, but it can be a positive contributor to activism, and it is inescapable in the current digital climate. A 2011 correlational study conducted by Georgetown University entitled "The Dynamics of Cause Engagement" determined that so-called slacktivists are indeed "more likely to take meaningful actions". Notably, "slacktivists participate in more than twice as many activities as people who don't engage in slacktivism, and their actions "have a higher potential to influence others". Cited benefits of slacktivism in achieving clear objectives include creating a secure, low-cost, effective means of organizing that is environmentally friendly. These "social champions" have the ability to directly link social media engagement with responsiveness, leveraging their transparent dialogue into economic, social or political action. Going along this mindset is Andrew Leonard, a staff writer at Salon, who published an article on the ethics of smartphones and how we use them. Though the means of producing these products go against ethical human rights standards, Leonard encourages the use of smartphones on the basis that the technology they provide can be utilized as a means of changing the problematic situation of their manufacture. The ability to communicate quickly and on a global scale enables the spread of knowledge, such as the conditions that corporations provide to the workers they employ, and the result their widespread manufacturing has on globalization. Leonard argues that phones and tablets can be effective tools in bringing about change through slacktivism, because they allow us to spread knowledge, donate money, and more effectively speak our opinions on important matters.

Others keep a slightly optimistic outlook on the possibilities of slacktivism while still acknowledging the pitfalls that come with this digital form of protest. Zeynep Tufekci analyzed the capacity of slacktivism to influence collective group action in a variety of different social movements in a segment of the Berkman Luncheon Series. She acknowledges that digital activism is a great enabler of rising social and political movements, and it is an effective means of enabling differential capacity building for protest. A 2015 study describes how slacktivism can contribute to a quicker growth of social protests, by propagation of information through peripheral nodes in social networks. The authors note that although slacktivists are less active than committed minorities, their power lies in their numbers: "their aggregate contribution to the spread of protest messages is comparable in magnitude to that of core participants". However, Tufekci argues that the enhanced ability to rally protest is accompanied by a weakened ability to actually make an impact, as slacktivism can fail to reach the level of protest required in order to bring about change.

The Black Lives Matter movement calls for the end of systemic racism. The movement has been inextricably linked with social media since 2014, in particular to Twitter with the hashtags #blacklivesmatter and #BLM. Much of the support and awareness of this movement has been made possible through social media. Studies show that the slacktivism commonly present within the movement has been linked with a positive effect on active participation in it. The fact that participants in this movement were able to contribute from their phones increased awareness and participation of the public, particularly in the United States.

The Western-centric nature of the critique of slacktivism discounts the impact it can have in authoritarian or repressive contexts. Journalist Courtney C. Radsch argues that even such low level of engagement was an important form of activism for Arab youth before and during the Arab Spring because it was a form of free speech, and could successfully spark mainstream media coverage, such as when a hashtag becomes "a trending topic [it] helps generate media attention, even as it helps organize information....The power of social media to help shape the international news agenda is one of the ways in which they subvert state authority and power." In addition, studies suggest that "fears of Internet activities supplanting real-life activity are unsubstantiated," in that they do not cause a negative or positive effect on political participation.

The Human Rights Campaign (HRC) on Marriage Equality offers another example of how slacktivism can be used to make a notable difference. The campaign urged Facebook users to change their profile pictures to a red image that had an equals sign (=) in the middle. The logo symbolized equality and if Facebook users put the image as their profile photo, it meant they were in support of marriage equality. The campaign was credited for raising positive awareness and cultivating an environment of support for the marriage equality cause. This study concluded that, although the act of changing one's profile photo is small, ultimately social media campaigns such as this make a cumulative difference over time.

== Types ==
=== Clicktivism ===
The term "clicktivism" is used to describe forms of internet-based slacktivism such as signing online petitions or signing and sending form letter emails to politicians or corporate CEOs. For example, the British group UK Uncut use Twitter and other websites to organise protests and direct action against companies accused of tax avoidance. It allows organizations to quantify their success by keeping track of how many "clicked" on their petition or other call to action.

The idea behind clicktivism is that social media allow for a quick and easy way to show support for an organization or cause. The main focus of digital organizations has become inflating participation rates by asking less and less of their members/viewers.

Clicktivism can also be demonstrated by monitoring the success of a campaign by how many "likes" it receives. Clicktivism strives to quantify support, presence and outreach without putting emphasis on real participation. The act of "liking" a photo on Facebook or clicking a petition is in itself symbolic because it demonstrates that the individual is aware of the situation and it shows their peers the opinions and thoughts they have on certain subject matters.

Critics of clicktivism state that this new phenomenon turns social movements to resemble advertising campaigns in which messages are tested, clickthrough rate is recorded, and A/B testing is often done. In order to improve these metrics, messages are reduced to make their "asks easier and actions simpler". This in turn reduces social action to having members that are a list of email addresses, rather than engaged people.

=== Charity ===
Charity slacktivism is an action in support of a cause that takes little effort on the part of the individual. Examples of online charity slacktivism include posting a Facebook status to support a cause, "liking" a charity organization's cause on Facebook, tweeting or retweeting a charity organization's request for support on Twitter, signing Internet petitions, and posting and sharing YouTube videos about a cause. It can be argued that a person is not "liking" the photo in order to help the person in need, but to feel better about themselves, and to feel like they have done something positive for the person or scene depicted in front of them. This phenomenon has become increasingly popular with individuals whether they are going on trips to help less fortunate people, or by "liking" many posts on Facebook in order to "help" the person in the picture. Examples include the Kony 2012 campaign that exploded briefly in social media in March 2012.

Examples of offline charity slacktivism include awareness wristbands and paraphernalia in support of causes, such as the Livestrong wristband, as well as bumper stickers and mobile donating. In 2020, during the COVID-19 pandemic, Clap for Our Carers gained traction in several countries.

The term slacktivism is often used to describe the world's reaction to the 2010 Haiti earthquake. The Red Cross managed to raise $5 million in 2 days via text message donations. Social media outlets were used to spread the word about the earthquake. The day after the earthquake, CNN reported that four of Twitter's top topics were related to the Haitian earthquake.

=== Charity as a by-product of purchasing products ===
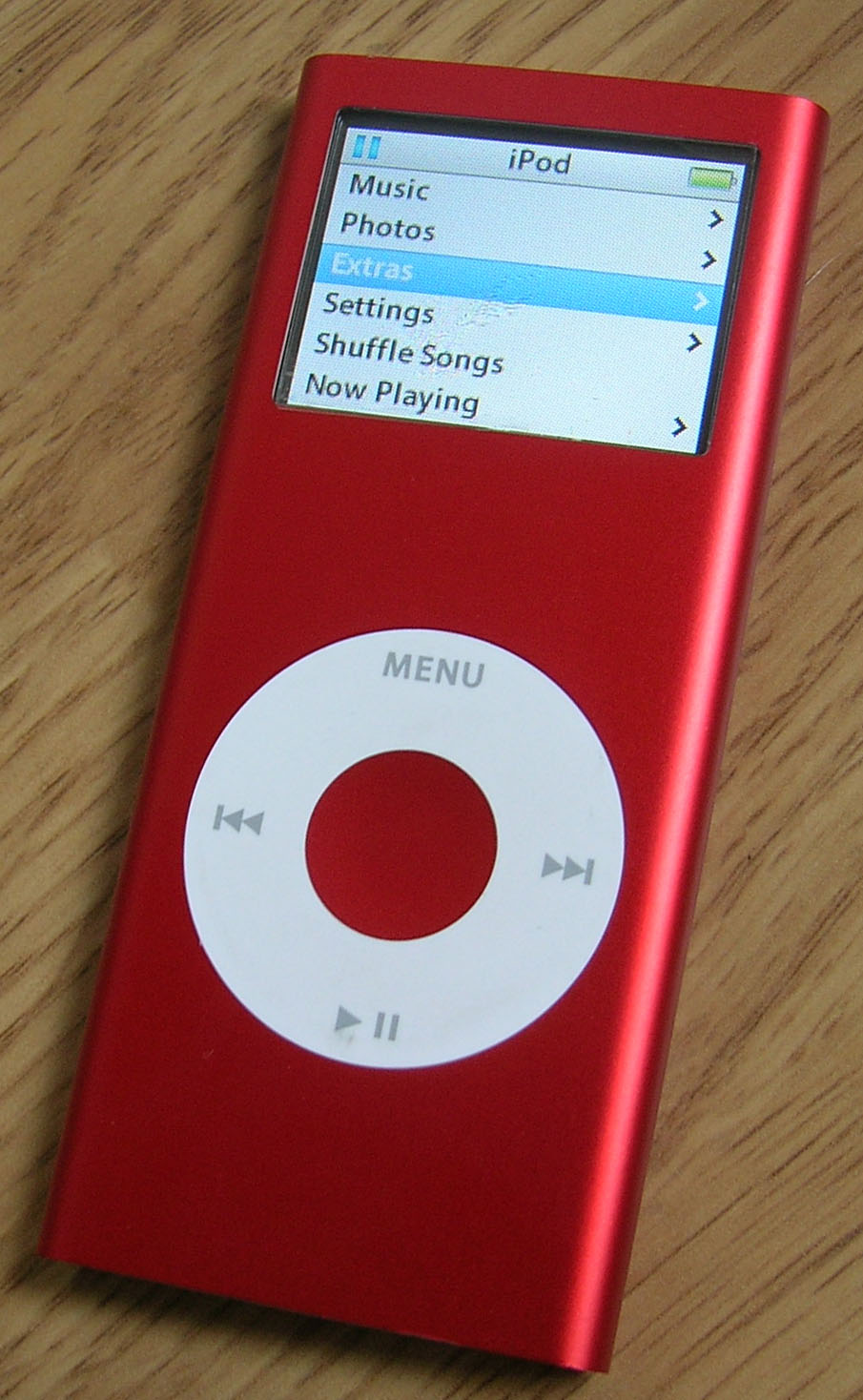
A red iPod nano, an example of supporting a charity through buying products

This is the act of purchasing products that highlight support for a particular cause and advertise that a percentage of the cost of the good will go to the cause. In some instances the donated funds are spread across various entities within one foundation, which in theory helps several deserving areas of the cause. An example of this is the Product Red campaign, whereby consumers can buy Red-branded variants of common products, with a proportion of proceeds going towards fighting AIDS. The campaign has been criticised for the small share of the retail price that is actually donated and for spending more on marketing than it raises: by 2007, retail partners including Gap, Motorola and Apple had reportedly spent around US$100 million on advertising while raising about US$18 million for the Global Fund.

Slacktivists may also purchase a product from a company because it has a history of donating funds to charity, as a way to second-handedly support a cause. For example, a slacktivist may buy Ben and Jerry's ice cream because its founders invested in the nation's children, or promoted social and environmental concerns.

=== Political ===
Certain forms of slacktivism have political goals in mind, such as gaining support for a presidential campaign, or signing an internet petition that aims to influence governmental action.

The online petition website Change.org claimed it was attacked by Chinese hackers and brought down in April 2011. Change.org claimed the fact that hackers "felt the need to bring down the website must be seen as a testament to Change.org's fast-growing success and a vindication of one particular petition: A Call for the Release of Ai Weiwei." Ai Weiwei, a noted human rights activist who had been arrested by Chinese authorities in April 2011, was released on June 22, 2011, from Beijing, which was deemed as a victory by Change.org of its online campaign and petition demanding Ai's release.

=== Sympathy ===
Sympathy slacktivism can be observed on social media networks such as Facebook, where users can like pages to support a cause or show support to people in need. Also common in this type of slacktivism is for users to change their profile pictures to one that shows the user's peers that they care about the topic. This can be considered a virtual counterpart of wearing a pin to display one's sympathies; however, acquiring such a pin often requires some monetary donation to the cause while changing profile picture does not.

In sympathy slacktivism, images of young children, animals and people seemingly in need are often used to give a sense of credibility to the viewers, making the campaign resonate longer in their memory. Using children in campaigns is often the most effective way of reaching a larger audience due to the fact that most adults, when exposed to the ad, would not be able to ignore a child in need.

An example of sympathy slacktivism is the Swedish newspaper Aftonbladet's campaign "Vi Gillar Olika" (literal translation: "We like different"). This campaign was launched against xenophobia and racism, something that was a hot topic in Sweden in 2010. The main icon of the campaign was an open hand with the text "Vi Gillar Olika," the icon that was adopted from the French organisation SOS Racisme's campaign Touche pas à mon Pote in 1985.

Another example was when Facebook users added a Norwegian flag to their pictures after the 2011 Norway attacks in which 77 people were killed. This campaign received attention from the Swedish Moderate Party, who encouraged their supporters to update their profile pictures.

== Examples ==
=== Kony 2012 ===
Kony 2012 was a campaign created by Invisible Children in the form of a 28-minute video about the dangerous situation of many children in Africa at the hands of Joseph Kony, the leader of the Lord's Resistance Army (LRA). The LRA is said to have abducted a total of nearly 60,000 children, brainwashing the boys to fight for them and turning the girls into sex slaves.

The campaign was used as an experiment to see if an online video could reach such a large audience that it would make a war criminal, Joseph Kony, famous. It became the fastest-growing viral video of all time, reaching 100 million views in six days. The campaign grew an unprecedented amount of awareness, calling to international leaders as well as the general population.

The reaction to and participation in this campaign demonstrates charity slacktivism due to the way in which many viewers responded. The success of the campaign has been attributed mostly by how many people viewed the video rather than the donations received. After watching the video, many viewers felt compelled to take action. This action, however, took the form of sharing the video and potentially pledging their support.

As described by Sarah Kendzior of Aljazeera:

The video seemed to embody the slacktivist ethos: viewers oblivious to a complex foreign conflict are made heroic by watching a video, buying a bracelet, hanging a poster. Advocates of Invisible Children's campaign protested that their desire to catch Kony was sincere, their emotional response to the film genuine—and that the sheer volume of supporters calling for the capture of Joseph Kony constituted a meaningful shift in human rights advocacy."

=== Chibok schoolgirls kidnapping ===
In the weeks following the kidnapping of hundreds of schoolgirls by the organization Boko Haram, the hashtag #BringBackOurGirls began to trend globally on Twitter as the story continued to spread and by May 11 it had attracted 2.3 million tweets. One such tweet came from the First Lady of the United States, Michelle Obama, holding a sign displaying the hashtag, posted to her official Twitter account, helping to spread the awareness of the kidnapping. Comparisons have been made between the #BringBackOurGirls campaign and the Kony 2012 campaign. The campaign was labeled slacktivism by some critics, particularly as the weeks and months passed with no progress being made in recovery of the kidnapped girls.

According to Mkeki Mutah, uncle of one of the kidnapped girls:

There is a saying: "Actions speak louder than words." Leaders from around the world came out and said they would assist to bring the girls back, but now we hear nothing. The question I wish to raise is: why? If they knew they would not do anything, they wouldn't have even made that promise at all. By just coming out to tell the world, I see that as a political game, which it shouldn't be so far as the girls are concerned.

== See also ==
- Argumentum ad populum
- Armchair revolutionary
- Armchair warrior
- Awareness activism
- Call-out culture
- Culture of fear
- Doomscrolling
- Hashtag activism
- openPetition
- Performative activism
- Social justice warrior
- Thoughts and prayers
- Virtue signalling
