= Social justice warrior =

Pejorative term for a socially progressive person

Social justice warrior (SJW) is a pejorative term and Internet meme mostly used for an individual who promotes socially progressive, left-wing or liberal views, including environmentalism, affirmative action, gun control, single payer healthcare, progressive taxation, feminism, abortion, LGBTQ rights, and multiculturalism. The accusation that somebody is an SJW carries implications that they are pursuing personal validation rather than any deep-seated conviction, and engaging in disingenuous arguments.

The phrase originated in the late 20th century as a neutral or positive term for people engaged in social justice activism. In 2011, when the term first appeared on Twitter, it changed from a primarily positive term to an overwhelmingly negative one. During the Gamergate controversy, the term was adopted by what would become the alt-right, and the negative connotations gained increased usage which would eventually overshadow its origins.

== Meaning ==
=== Original meaning ===
Dating back to 1824, the term social justice refers to justice on a societal level. From the early 1990s to the early 2000s, social-justice warrior was used as a neutral or complimentary phrase, as when a 1991 Montreal Gazette article describes union activist Michel Chartrand as a "Quebec nationalist and social-justice warrior".

Katherine Martin, the head of U.S. dictionaries at Oxford University Press, said in 2015 that "[a]ll of the examples I've seen until quite recently are lionizing the person". As of 2015, the Oxford English Dictionary had not done a full search for the earliest usage. Merriam-Webster dates the earliest use of the term to 1945.

=== Pejorative meaning ===
According to Martin, the term switched from primarily positive to negative around 2011, when it was first used as an insult on Twitter. The term first appeared on Urban Dictionary in 2011 and on the Something Awful forums in 2013. According to Know Your Meme, the pejorative term "keyboard warrior", which describes a person who is unreasonably angry and hides behind their keyboard, may be a precursor to the "social justice warrior". The negative connotation has primarily been aimed at those espousing views adhering to social progressivism, cultural inclusivity, or feminism. Scott Selisker writes in New Literary History that the SJW is often criticised as the "stereotype of the feminist as unreasonable, sanctimonious, biased, and self-aggrandizing". Use of the term has also been described as attempting to degrade the motivations of the person accused of being an SJW, implying that their motives are "for personal validation rather than out of any deep-seated conviction". Allegra Ringo in Vice writes that "in other words, SJWs don't hold strong principles, but they pretend to. The problem is, that's not a real category of people. It's simply a way to dismiss anyone who brings up social justice."

The term's negative use became mainstream due to the 2014 Gamergate harassment campaign, where it emerged as the favored term of Gamergate proponents and was popularized on websites such as Reddit, 4chan, and Twitter. Gamergate supporters used the term to criticise what they claimed were unwanted external influences in video game media from progressive sources. Martin states that "the perceived orthodoxy [of progressive politics] has prompted a backlash among people who feel their speech is being policed". In Internet and video game culture, the phrase is broadly associated with a wider culture war that also included the 2015 Sad Puppies campaign that affected the Hugo Awards. A study from Feminist Media Studies noted that "the appropriation of SJW as a memetic straw man became commonplace during and following the upheaval of #Gamergate."

In August 2015, social justice warrior was one of several new words and phrases added to Oxford Dictionaries. Woke has been used ironically by the right wing to ridicule perceived left-wing "social justice warriors" and "snowflakes", in connection with mockery of Millennials and Gen Z.

== See also ==
- Anti-racism
- Cancel culture
- Hashtag activism
- Loony left
- Political correctness
- Slacktivism
- Tumblr
- Virtue signalling
