= Moses Abigdor Lichtenstadt =

Moses Abigdor Lichtenstadt (1787–1870) was a Hebraist and Talmud scholar from Lublin, Poland.

He was known for his great charity towards poor students, and helped found public schooling for Jewish children in Odessa. He wrote a number of articles on Biblical and Talmudic subjects for various publications, as well as Mi-Mochorat ha-Shabbat (Vienna, 1860) against the Karaites.
