= David Moses Mitzkun =

- Born: May 1836
- Died: July 23, 1887 (aged 51); Vilna, Vilna Governorate, Russian Empire
- Writing career
- Language: Hebrew
- Literary movement: Haskalah

David Moses Mitzkun (Hebrew: דוד משה בן קלמן מיצקון; May 1836 – July 23, 1887) was a Russian Hebraist. He was a writer of Hebrew prose and poetry, and maintained himself chiefly by teaching Hebrew. A collection of his Hebrew poems entitled Kinnor David was published in Vilna in 1863.
