= IDonate =

iDonate
- iDonate logo
- Company type: Limited Company
- Founded: Galway (2011)
- Founder: Alan Coyne
- Headquarters: Galway Ireland
- Products: Online fundraising tools
- Website: www.idonate.ie

iDonate is an online fundraising platform for charities and non profit organisations in Ireland. It was launched in 2011, and available to charities, nonprofit organisations and crowdfunders in Ireland.

== Formation and organisation ==
iDonate was formed in 2013 by Alan Coyne. Coyne was then technical director with Western Webs in Tuam, County Galway, and later developed the iCrowdFund crowdfunding website and a micro-donations app.

iDonate is a private company, and is a member of Fundraising Ireland, the association for professional fundraisers in Ireland.

iDonate was a recipient of the SCCUL Entrepreneurship Social Enterprises Award in 2012, was a regional finalist in the Ulster Bank Business Achievers Awards in 2013, and was featured by Silicon Republic as "Tech Start-up of the Week" in July 2013.

In 2019, iDonate's Charity Tax Back service introduced electronic signatures on CHY3/4 Charitable Donation Scheme forms. It launched an online raffle creator in 2020, and a personal fundraising & crowdfunding service in 2022.

== Services ==
The services available on the iDonate fundraising platform include :

- iDonate - a fundraising service for registered charities and trusts in Ireland.
- iFundraise Fundraising - for nonprofits who do not have charitable status, such as schools, sports clubs, community groups and individual causes.
- Charity Tax Back - a service to remind donors if they reach the threshold which allows tax relief on charitable donations.
- Take The Challenge - a service to nominate people to do a fundraising challenge.
- Virtual event support for fundraisers
- iRegister - an event registration system
- TENDO Giving - a micro-donations app.
- Crowdfunding for personal fundraising and once-off fundraisers.
