= Milton Badger =

American Congregational minister

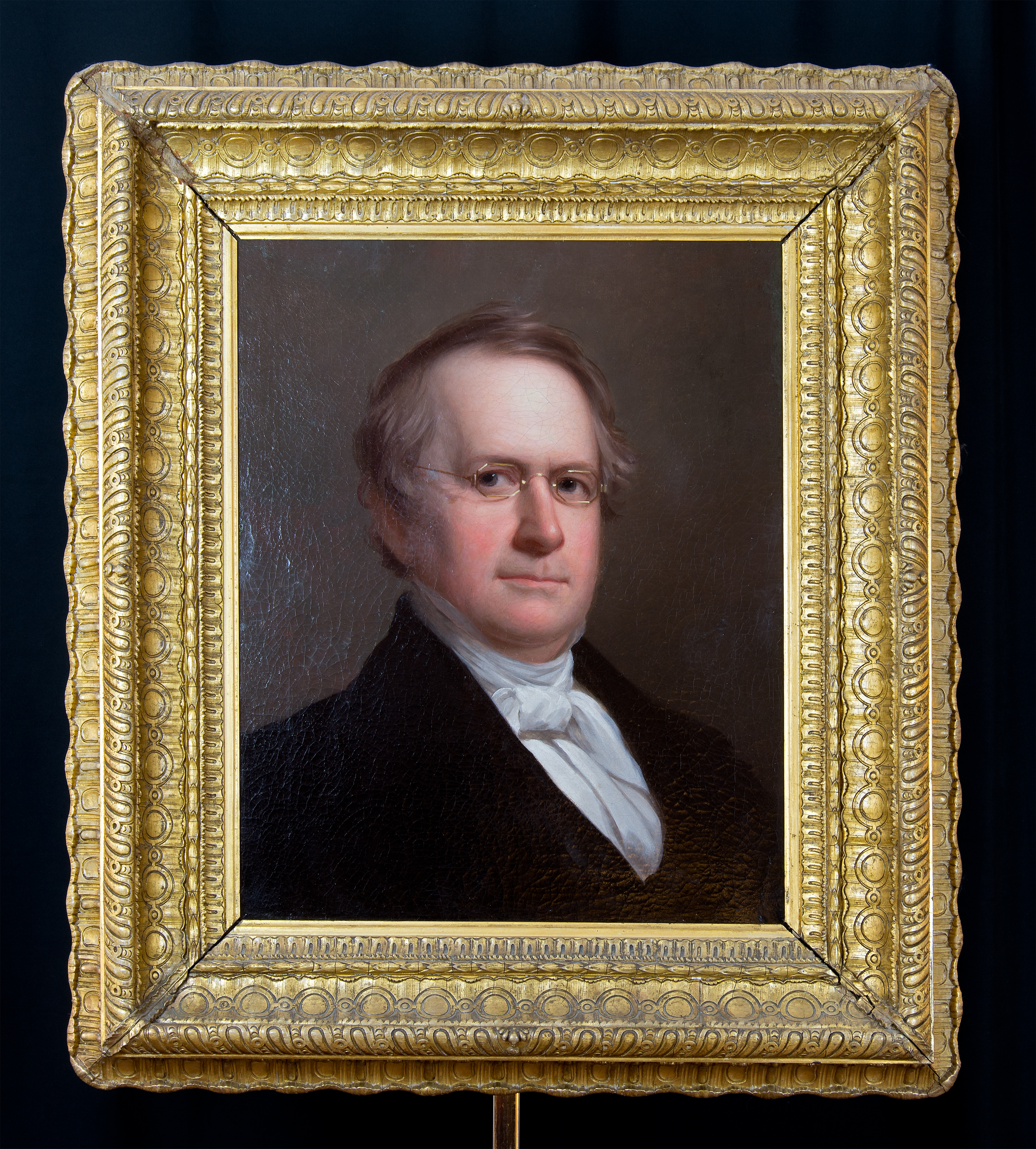
- portrait by Nathaniel Jocelyn
- Born: May 6, 1800; Andover
- Died: March 1, 1873 (aged 72); Madison
- Spouse(s): Clarissa Munger Badger

Milton Badger (May 6, 1800 – March 1, 1873) was an American Congregational minister.

Milton Badger was born on May 6, 1800 in Andover, Connecticut.

He graduated at Yale College in 1823, and was immediately appointed principal of an academy in New Canaan, Conn., from which, at the end of the year, he retired to pursue the course at the Andover Theological Seminary. Here he spent two years, and then accepted a tutorship in Yale College, continuing, meanwhile, his studies in the theological department of the college, and completing his course in 1827. The pulpit of the South Church in Andover, Mass., being vacated by the resignation of Rev. Justin Edwards, D.D., Badger was called, and was duly ordained and installed pastor Jan. 3, 1828. His ministry in this place is characterized as a continuous revival, extending over the seven and a half years of his pastorate. In May, 1835, he was elected to the office of associate secretary of the American Home Missionary Society, in which he distinguished himself by his arduous labor and great sagacity, and in which he continued until the time of his death.

Milton Badger died on 1 March 1873 in Madison, Connecticut.
