= George Munger =

George Munger may refer to:

- George Munger (American football) (1909–1994), American football player and coach
- George Munger (artist) (1781–1825), American engraver known for portraits and miniatures
- George Munger (soldier), soldier in the American Civil War
- George G. Munger (1828–1895), American lawyer and politician from New York
- George "Red" Munger (1918–1996), American baseball player
