= Gongoozler =

Recreational canal watcher in the UK

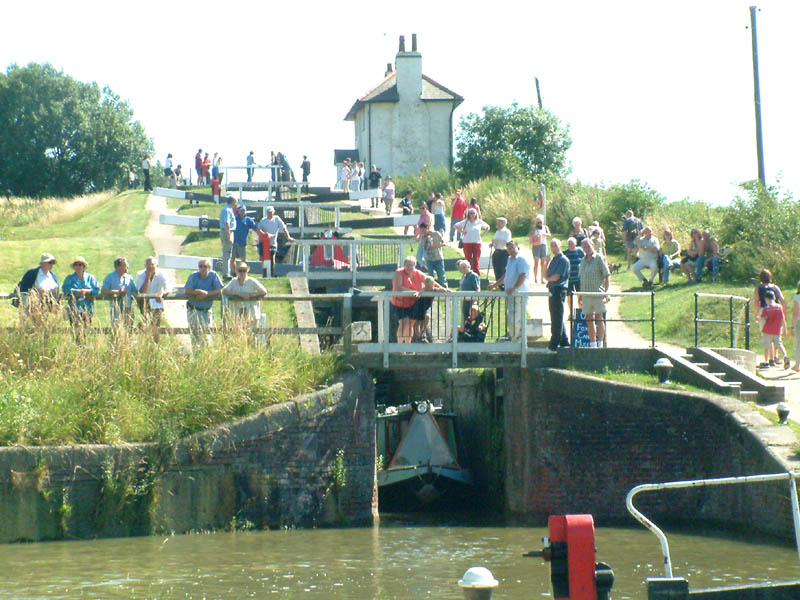
Gongoozlers at the Foxton Locks in England

A gongoozler is a person who enjoys watching activity on the canals of the United Kingdom. The term is also used more generally to describe those who harbour an interest in canals and canal life, but do not actively participate.

== Etymology ==
Gongoozler may have been canal workers' slang for an observer standing apparently idle on the towpath. According to The Times, the term has also previously been used to describe "someone who hung around bridges to laugh at the inept efforts of less experienced barge folk as they struggled to pass through locks". Though it was used derisively in the past, today the term is regularly used, perhaps with a little irony, by barge communities and clubs to describe themselves and their hobby.

The word may have arisen from words in Lincolnshire dialect: gawn and gooze, both meaning to stare or gape. It might be presumed that such an expression would date from the nineteenth century, when canals were at their peak, but the word is only recorded from the end of that century or the early twentieth. It was given wider use by L. T. C. Rolt, who used it in his book about canal life, Narrow Boat, in 1944. A gawn is also a small ship of lading, such as a working-narrowboat.

The term gongoozler may also be used in any circumstance in which people are spectating without contributing to either the content or interest of an event. According to the team behind BBC Radio 4 programme Word of Mouth, the word can mean "a person who likes to mindlessly stare (at anything)".

== Aspects of gongoozling ==
Gongoozling, much like trainspotting, is a hobby that can extend to all aspects of canals.

=== Canal artwork ===
The collection or creation of canal-related artwork is a common pastime amongst gongoozlers. This includes paintings, postcards and photographs.

=== Canal locks ===
Canal locks often attract spectators, including gongoozlers, because the operation of manual canal locks is a complex affair, with a number of opportunities for mistakes to be made. Some observers have been known to heckle or harass the boat crews, whilst others carry a lock windlass and actively wish to help boat crews with their passage, by opening the paddles, or helping push open the heavy balance beams on the gates.

=== Canal history and technology ===
Whilst trainspotting is commonly associated with identifying engine makes, it is rare for Gongoozlers to do likewise. However an interest can occur for the history of a section of canal, or the operation of locks and alternative devices such as inclined planes, water slopes, and boat lifts with types like the Anderton boat lift, the Falkirk Wheel and the Strépy-Thieu boat lift.

== Notable locations ==
The eight locks of Fonserannes on the Canal du Midi in Southern France attract so many gongoozlers that they have become the third most popular tourist attraction in Languedoc.

In the UK, Foxton Locks (pictured above) in Leicestershire and the Caen Hill flight on the edge of Devizes, Wiltshire are popular locations for gongoozlers to gather.

== See also ==
- Aircraft spotting
- Birdwatching
- Bus spotting
- Kibitzing
- Trainspotting
- Umarell
