= Armchair general =

Slang term

"Armchair general" is a derogatory term for a person who regards themselves as an expert on military matters, despite having little to no actual experience in the military. Alternatively, it can mean a military commander who does not participate in actual combat. It was first used in 1900 in the Ottawa Journal. The term is one of a family of "armchair experts" or "armchair theorists", such as the armchair revolutionary, armchair warrior, or, in naval operations, the armchair admiral.

== Conventional usage ==
The most common usage of the term refers to "[a] person without military experience who regards himself as an expert military strategist."

This person may be a civilian whose only exposure to the military or military history is through academic or self-study, or a former member of the military, who was of low rank and/or has no experience with planning or strategic decision-making. In both cases, these individuals claim to be more capable of analyzing combat conditions and making strategic judgments than past military commanders who have been responsible for such analysis and decisions (see also Armchair theorizing).

== Alternate usage ==
The term is also used to describe "a military commander who is not actively involved in warfare, or who directs troops from a position of comfort or safety." These officers' duties are described by the media and the rest of the military as more bureaucratic than functional, and who have little to no experience in combat or warfare, yet hold a great degree of authority over soldiers or commanders who do.

The term is not exclusively applied to officers of command rank (such as generals or admirals); it is also a popular term among enlisted personnel and the media to describe high-ranking officers whose rank affords them superior privileges, especially when they have attained rank through higher education, or the influence of their families, rather than combat duty.

=== Origin ===
- Carl von Clausewitz alluded to "someone following operations from an armchair".

== Armchair admiral ==
The variant "armchair admiral" is analogous to the armchair general in a naval context, particularly if the supposed admiral does not have long-term experience at sea themselves.

== See also ==
- Armchair warrior
- Armchair revolutionary
- Backseat driver
- Dilettante
- Hindsight bias
- Pogue/REMF
- Umarell
