= Gilbert Munger =

American painter

Gilbert Munger (April 14, 1837 – January 27, 1903) was a late 19th-century American landscape painter whose romantic yet topographically accurate landscapes helped to introduce the newly opened West to the American public.

== Biography ==
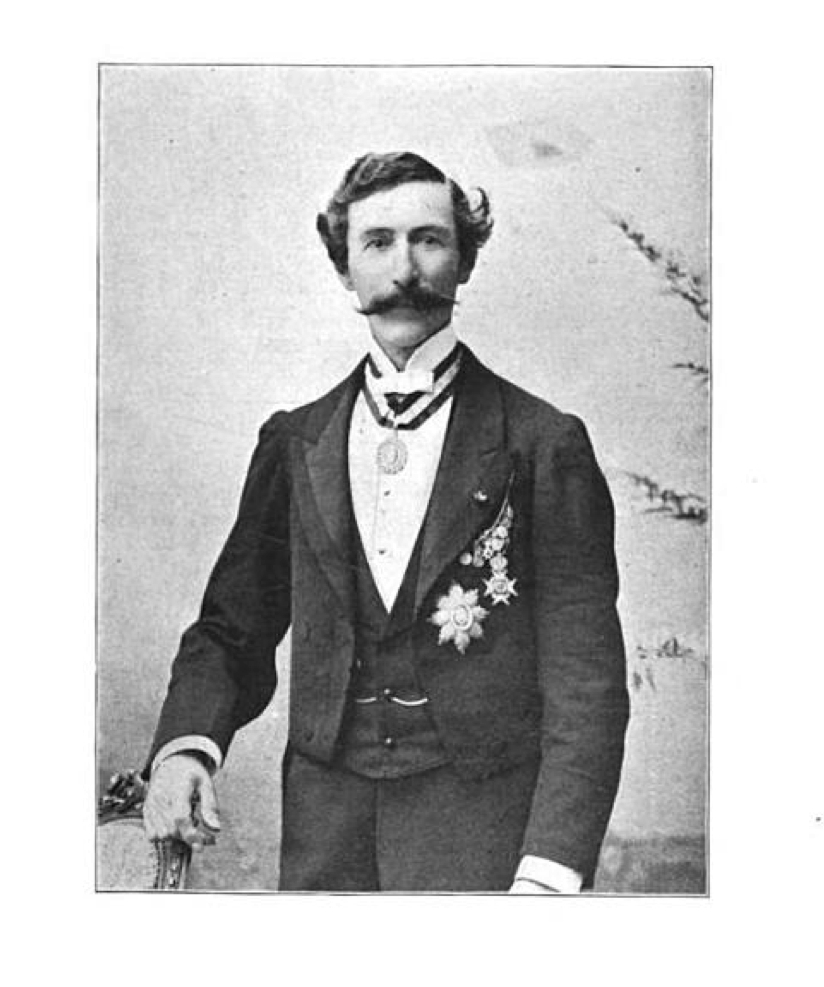
Gilbert Munger, photograph taken c. 1870

Gilbert Davis Munger was born on April 14, 1837, in Madison, Connecticut, to Sherman and Lucretia (Benton) Munger, the last of five children. He was a distant cousin of the American engraver and artist George Munger. When he evinced artistic talent at an early age, his family sent him to Washington, D.C., at the age of just 13 to apprentice with William H. Dougal, who was then senior engraver at the Smithsonian Institution. Among his tasks was to produce engravings for government reports, and he turned out plates of animals, birds, fish, reptiles, and plants related to the scientific work of Louis Agassiz and the explorations of Commodore Charles Wilkes. As a painter, however, he was largely self-taught and was inspired in the development of his style by reading the work of John Ruskin and studying the painters of the Hudson River School. During this period of his life, he began to make friends with other artists, including John Mix Stanley and John Ross Key.

Munger served in the Union Army as a military engineer helping to build the fortifications around Washington, D.C., during the Civil War. After the war he moved to New York, but he also began to spend time in the West as two of his brothers had settled in Minnesota. By the mid-1860s, he was beginning to gain some recognition for his landscapes.

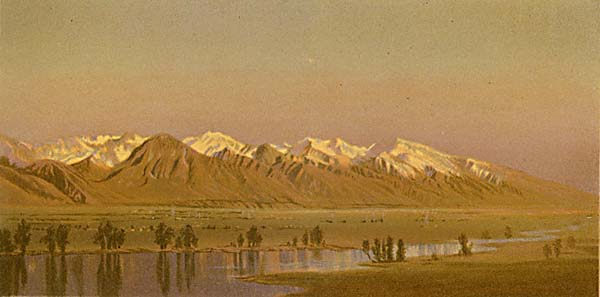
Engraving of the Wasatch Range from Salt Lake City, ca. 1870, after a sketch by Gilbert Munger.

A turning point in Munger's life came in 1869 when he joined Clarence King's famed Fortieth Parallel Survey as a guest artist. Munger's association with the expedition's scientists and with photographer Timothy H. O'Sullivan was instrumental in shaping him as one of a new generation of artists who foregrounded optical accuracy over allegory in their landscape work. During his two years with the survey, he painted the Wasatch Mountains in Utah and the Cascade Mountains in northern California, paying special attention to these areas' unique geological formations. Ten of Munger's survey paintings were later printed as chromolithographs in King's report on the survey's activities.

Between 1869 and 1875, Munger made other trips around the West, painting landscapes—especially volcanic mountains—in central and southern California, Oregon, and Washington. With Albert Bierstadt, he made a trip in November 1872 to paint Donner Pass, named after the famously ill-fated Donner Party. In this phase of his career, he made San Francisco his home base, and he became a recognized figure in the Bay Area art world and part of the cultural circle centered on Bret Harte's Overland Monthly. His work began to circulate in print and in exhibitions, and some of his paintings were even used as study aids for geology students at Yale University. Many of the locales he painted are now icons of American geography: Yosemite's El Capitan, San Francisco's Golden Gate, California's giant sequoias, Mount Shasta, Mount Rainier, Mount Hood, the Great Salt Lake, the Blue Ridge Mountains, Niagara Falls. For their expansive grandeur, Munger's paintings were frequently compared to those of Bierstadt and Thomas Moran, but his work differs from theirs in its greater attention to scientifically observed detail.

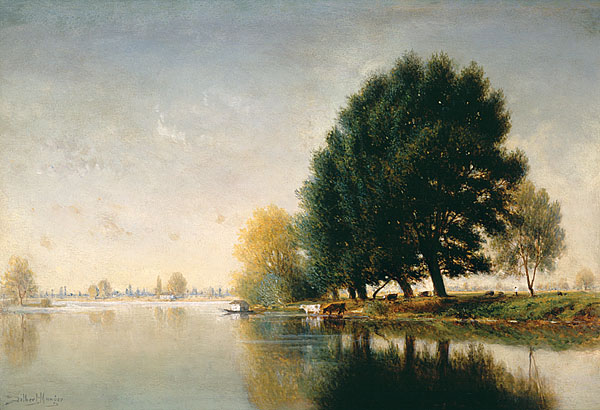
Gilbert Munger, oil painting, Seine Near Poissy, ca. 1880–90.

In 1877, Munger moved to Europe, living first in London (where he became a friend of John Millais) and later in Paris. In England, he painted reproductions of his Western landscapes (which were much in demand) as well as scenes around London, in Cornwall, and in Scotland. In France, he painted numerous landscapes along the Seine River and in the Barbizon region. At the instigation of John Ruskin, he also painted some 50 canvases of Venice; these are more vividly colored and looser in their brushwork than most of his earlier work. In general, his European paintings are more atmospheric than his landscapes of the American West, showing the influence of J. M. W. Turner as well as of Jean-Baptiste-Camille Corot and other painters of the Barbizon School. The European period saw the height of Munger's success and fame, with some of his paintings selling for substantial sums in the $1000–5000 range ($20,000–120,000 today). He was made a Chevalier of the Legion of Honor in France and awarded medals by the governments of Germany, Russia, and Belgium. He even took a side trip into writing, turning out a three-act comedy, Madelaine Marston, that was produced at the Theatre Royal in London in 1886 with Helen Barry in the cast.

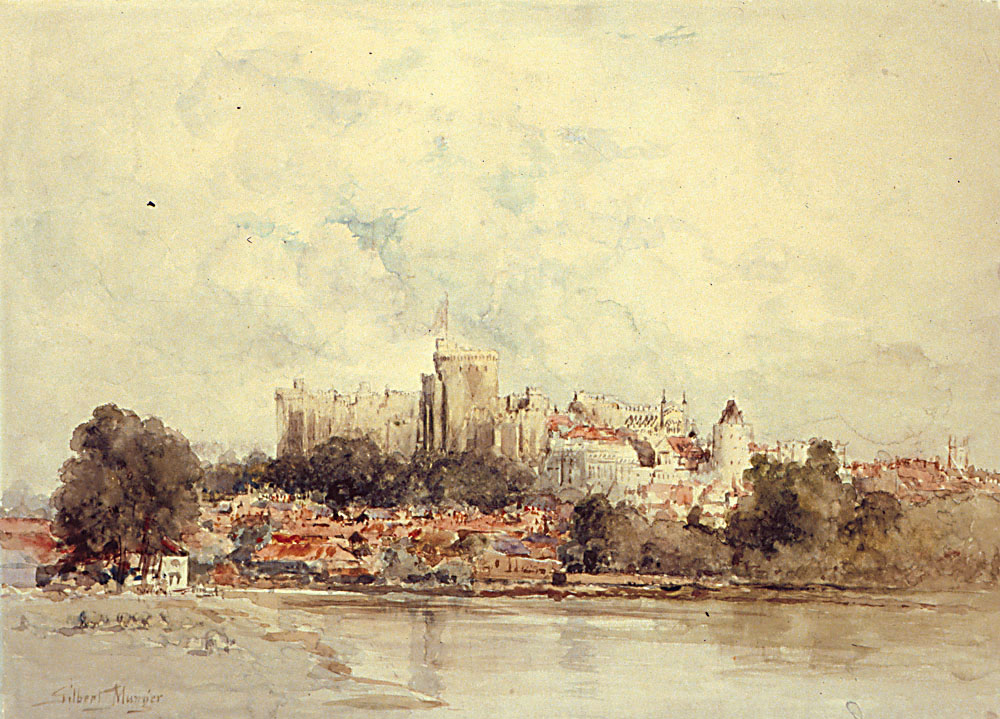
Gilbert Munger, watercolor of Windsor Castle, ca. 1877–1880.

In 1893, Munger returned to New York, where he produced reproductions of his European paintings as well as new landscapes of areas around West Virginia, New York, and elsewhere. He was unable to match his European level of success, however, and when he died in Washington, D.C., on January 27, 1903, he had fallen into relative obscurity. It may be that Munger's lifelong avoidance of the formal art-world institutions of academy exhibitions (with rare exceptions) and selling through dealers worked against him. He preferred to sell his work by word of mouth, and thus when he returned to America after a 15-year absence, he was unable to count on the assistance of a dealer in reintroducing him to his home market.

Munger's work is in the collections of numerous regional American museums as well as museums in Paris, Berlin, Munich, and Weimar. The largest collection is at the Tweed Museum of Art, University of Minnesota Duluth. His artwork is also featured in the Utah Museum of Fine Arts collection.

== Collections ==
"Museums containing Munger pictures."
