= War hawk =

Politician who favors war

In politics, the terms war hawk and hawk describe a person who is in favor of starting armed conflicts or escalating ongoing ones instead of attempting to solve problems through diplomacy or other nonviolent methods. Hawkish individuals are the opposite of war doves, who advocate negotiations and peaceful settlements to resolve disputes and view the option of going to war as one to be avoided by any means unless absolutely necessary. The terms are derived by historical analogy with the birds of the same name: hawks are predatory birds that attack and eat other animals, whereas doves eat seeds and fruit and are a symbol of peace.

Variations of the term include chicken hawk, referring to a person who supports waging war but previously avoided or is actively avoiding compulsory military service (i.e., cowardice), and liberal hawk, referring to a person who adheres to passive liberalism in domestic politics while simultaneously having a militaristic and interventionist foreign policy.

== Historical group ==
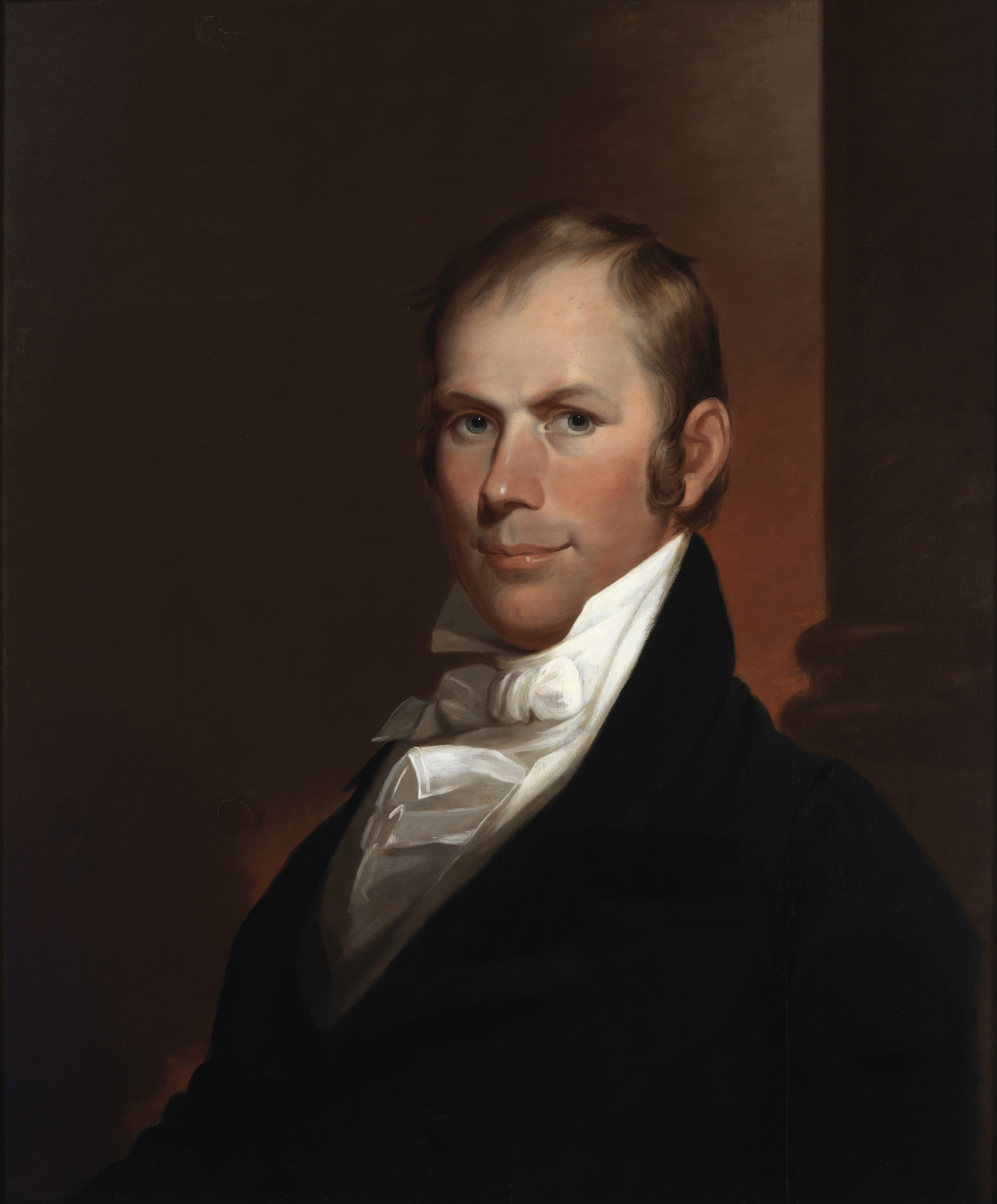
Henry Clay, a "guiding spirit" of the 19th-century war hawks

The term "war hawk" was coined in 1792 and was often used to ridicule politicians who favored a pro-war policy in peacetime. Historian Donald R. Hickey found 129 uses of the term in American newspapers before late 1811, mostly from Federalists warning against Democratic-Republican foreign policy. Some antiwar Democratic-Republicans used it, such as Virginia Congressman John Randolph of Roanoke. Randolph was one of the few congressmen who opposed a war with Britain, and perceived calls for such a conflict from war hawks as "foolhardy and driven by land hunger rather than violations of American rights." However, he was unsuccessful in countering the war hawks, who secured an American declaration of war against Britain in 1812, initiating the War of 1812.

There was never any "official" roster of War Hawks; as Hickey notes, "Scholars differ over who (if anyone) ought to be classified as a War Hawk." However, most historians use the term to describe about one or two dozen members of the Twelfth Congress. The leader of this faction was Speaker of the House Henry Clay of Kentucky. John C. Calhoun of South Carolina was another notable War Hawk. Both of these men became major players in American politics for decades, despite failing to win the presidency themselves. Other men traditionally identified as War Hawks include Richard Mentor Johnson of Kentucky, William Lowndes of South Carolina, Langdon Cheves of South Carolina, Felix Grundy of Tennessee, and William W. Bibb of Georgia.

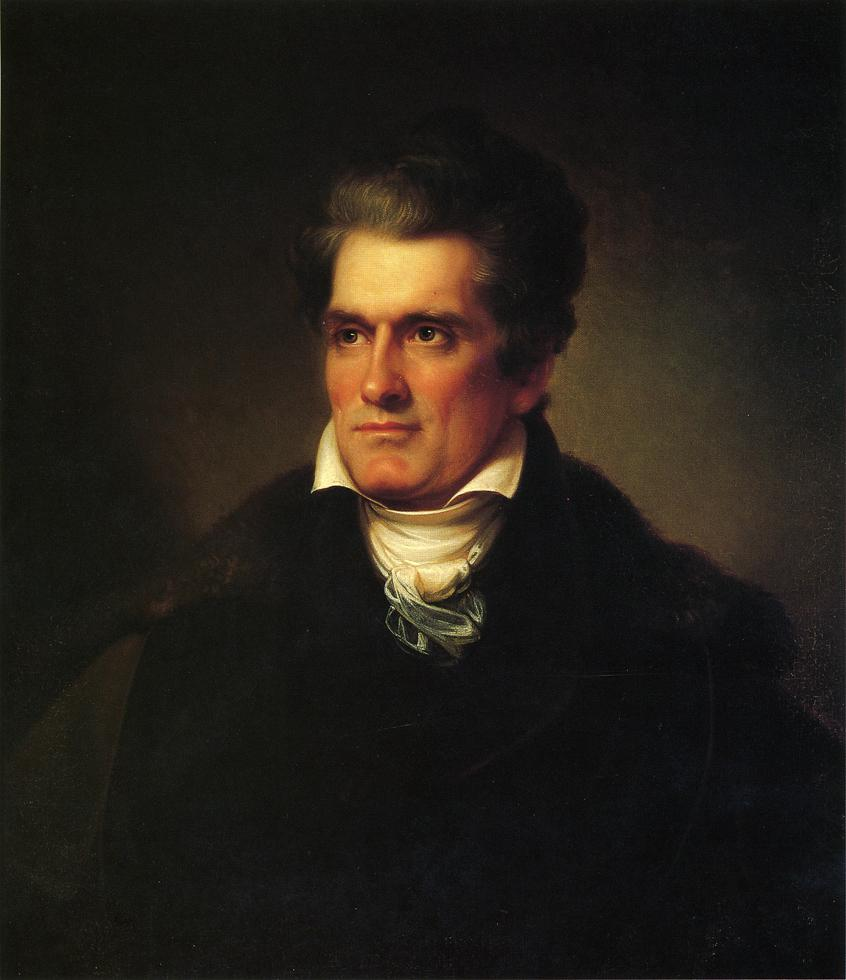
John C. Calhoun, another Southern politician famous for being a war hawk

President James Madison set the legislative agenda for Congress, providing committees in the House of Representatives with policy recommendations to be introduced as bills on the House floor. Nevertheless, he was regarded as a "timid soul" and tried to restrain the martial zeal of the War Hawks.

== Variations of the term ==
The term has also been expanded into "chicken hawk", referring to a war hawk who avoided military service.

The term "liberal hawk" is a derivation of the traditional phrase, in the sense that it denotes an individual with socially liberal inclinations coupled with an aggressive outlook on foreign policy. The term "neoconservative" is also used to denote an individual with conservative inclinations coupled with an aggressive outlook on foreign policy.

In modern American usage, "hawk" refers to a fierce advocate for a cause or policy, such as "deficit hawk" or "privacy hawk". It may also refer to a person or political leader who favors a strong or aggressive military policy, though not necessarily outright war.

In the Philippines, a war hawk is usually referred to, in slang, as "war freaks". The term is used to describe people who are belligerent or prone to arguments.

== Research ==
A 2026 peer-reviewed study published in Israel Affairs found that in Israel and Japan, national chauvinism was significantly correlated with support for aggressive foreign policies, while patriotism was not a strong predictor for hawkish policies. The study had defined national chauvinism as having belief in home-country superiority while patriotism was defined as having affection and commitment to one's country and feeling pride in their country and its institutions.

== Notable modern war hawks ==
- Lindsey Graham
- Eliot Cohen
- Dick Cheney
- Liz Cheney
- John Bolton
- Donald Trump

== See also ==
- Monetary hawk and dove
- Animal epithet
- Hardline
- Jingoism
- Warmonger (disambiguation)

== Bibliography ==
- "War Hawk | History, Significance, & Facts | Britannica". www.britannica.com.
- Oh, Inae. "On Afghanistan, the old war hawks are the new war hawks". Mother Jones.
