= Umarell =

Construction site watcher

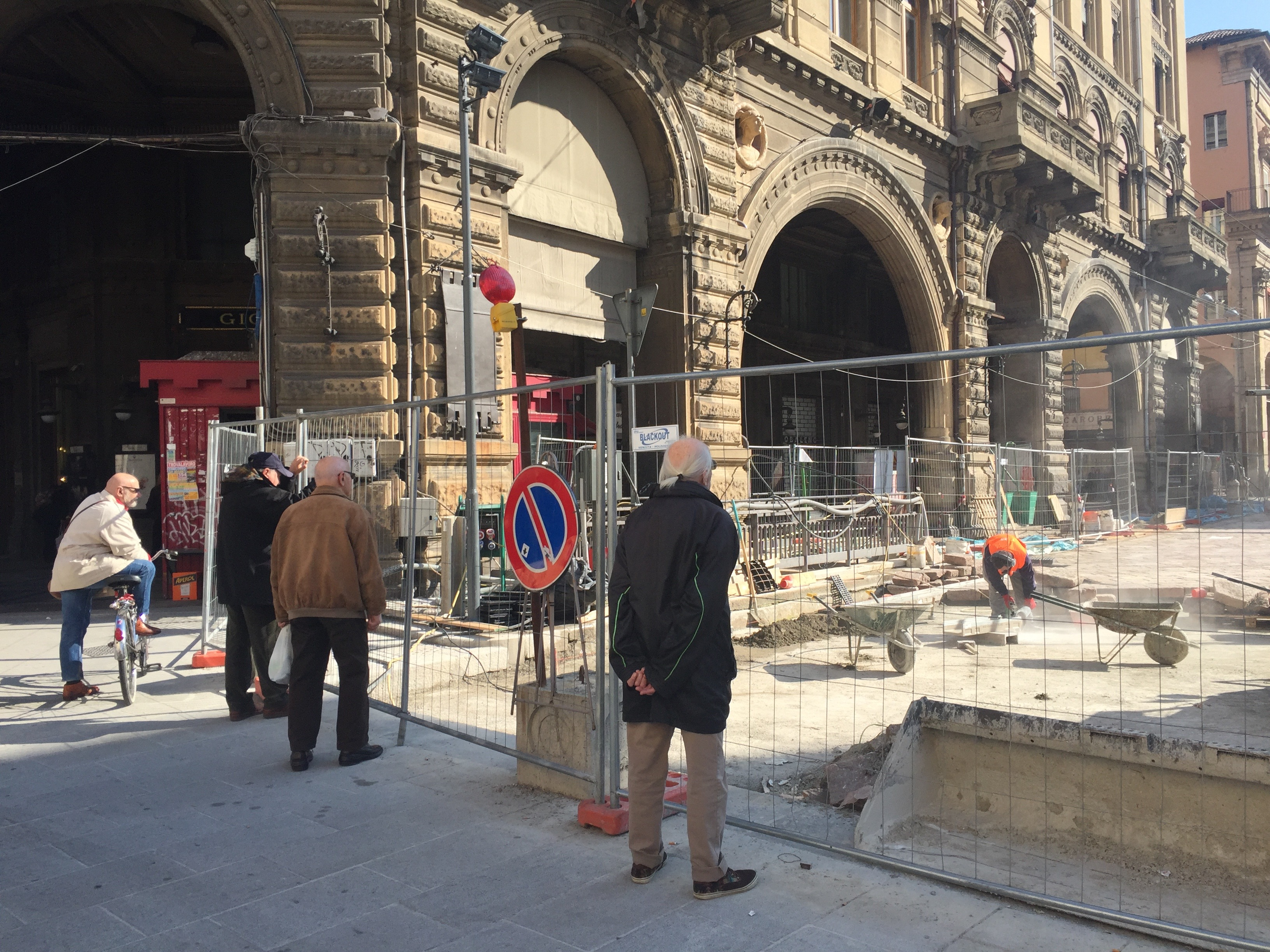
Umarells in Bologna, Italy, in 2016

Umarell (Italian spelling of the Bolognese Emilian word umarèl, Emilian pronunciation: [umaˈrɛːl]; plural umarelli) are men of retirement age who spend their time watching construction sites, especially roadworks – stereotypically with hands clasped behind their back and offering unrequested advice. Its literal meaning is "little man" (also umaréin). The term is employed as lighthearted mockery or self-deprecation.

The modern term was popularised in 2005 by local writer Danilo Masotti through three books and an associated blog. The word was included in the Italian Zingarelli dictionary in 2021 and in 2024 was included by the Language Council of Sweden in the annual list of new Swedish words – the Språkrådets nyordslista.

== Instances of use ==
In 2015, the city of Riccione, approximately 130 kilometres (80 miles) southeast of Bologna, allocated an €11,000 budget to pay a wage to umarells to oversee worksites in the city – counting the number of trucks in and out to ensure materials were delivered/removed according to the receipts, and guarding against theft when the site was otherwise unattended. The town of San Lazzaro di Savena, 6 km (3 1/2 mi) to the South-East of Bologna, awarded the "Umarell of the year" prize to a local resident, Franco Bonini.

In 2016, the local cultural association called Succede solo a Bologna ("It only happens in Bologna") released the "Umarèl card" as a fundraiser for continued restoration of the San Petronio church. Separately, a mobile app called Umarells was released that tracked the location of ongoing roadworks and construction sites. The fast food restaurant chain Burger King also "hired" several umarells as part of a social media marketing campaign promoting its increased presence in the country.

In July 2017, the Bologna city council's "consultative commission for street naming" approved the naming of a public square to the East of the city centre in the Cirenaica district Piazzetta degli Umarells in recognition of the local fame of the concept and the name – noting with conscious irony that the square was under construction at the time. In April 2018, it was inaugurated by city councillor Matteo Lepore, the district president Simone Borsari, the "lord of the umarells" Franco Bonini, the stand-up comedian Maurizio Pagliari (Dulio Pizzocchi), and the writer Danilo Masotti. A year later the street-sign for the square was stolen.

In April 2020, the comic magazine Topolino dedicated an episode to the umarell Gerindo Persichetti. In December 2020 in Pescara, the real estate developer Sarra installed windows to allow Umarells to observe three construction sites. Since 2019, an annual calendar has been sold in Bologna newsstands. In 2021, a board game La Giornata dell’Umarell (An Umarell's Day) was released.

Having officially entered the Swedish language in 2024, in October 2025 the municipality of Karlskoga formally inaugurated "Umarell benches" (sv: umarell-bänkar) for locals to monitor the construction of a local bathhouse.

In 2026, astrophysicists from the University of Bologna published a study on ultra-high-energy cosmic rays which included software that had been developed specifically for the study to "follow charged particles in a time-dependent cosmological environment", and was named in homage to the local term: "UMAREL" (Ultra-high-energy cosmic rays in Magnetic fields Affected by Rigidity diffusion and Energy Losses).

== See also ==
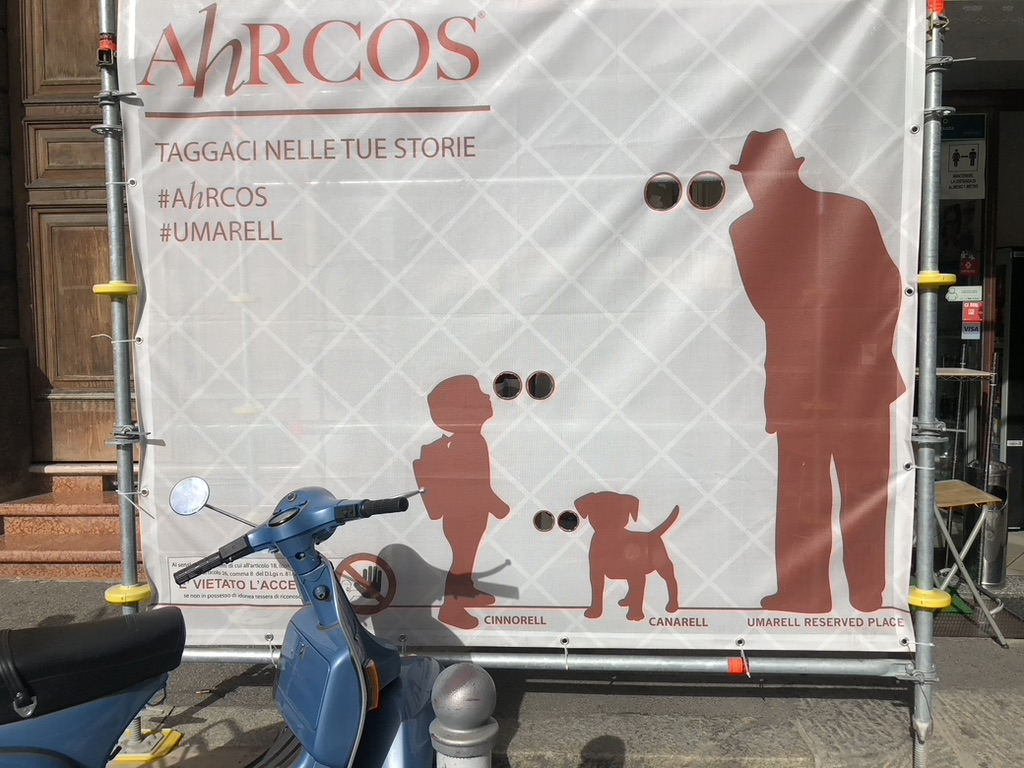
A construction site in Bologna with umarell observation holes for adults, children, and dogs

- Armchair general – Slang term
- Back-seat driver – Passenger in a vehicle who tries to direct the operator
- Gongoozler – Recreational canal watcher in the UK
- Kibitzer – Spectator of a chess or card game who offers unwanted advice or commentary
- Railfan – Rail transport enthusiast
- Rubbernecking – People staring tactlessly; gawkers

== Bibliography ==
- Masotti, Danilo (2010). Umarells 2.0. Sono tanti, vivono in mezzo a noi, ci osservano... e noi osserviamo loro [Umarells 2.0. They are many, they live amongst us, they observe us... and we observe them] (in Italian). Bologna: Pendragon Press. ISBN 978-8883428579.
- Masotti, Danilo (2016). Oltre il cantiere: fenomenologia degli Umarells [Beyond the Construction Site: the Phenomenology of the Umarells] (in Italian). Bologna: Pendragon Press. ISBN 9788865988077.
- Masotti, Danilo (2021). Umarells per sempre:Forever [Umarells forever] (in Italian). Bologna: Pendragon Press. ISBN 978-88-3364-322-9.
