= Back-seat driver =

Passenger in a vehicle who tries to direct the operator

A backseat driver (also spelled back-seat driver) is a passenger in a vehicle who is not controlling the vehicle but who comments on and/or criticizes the driver's actions and decisions. A backseat driver may be uncomfortable with the skills of the driver, feel out of control since they are not driving the vehicle, or want to tutor the driver while they are at the wheel. Many comment on the speed of the vehicle, or give alternative directions.

Some backseat drivers exhibit this type of behavior simply because they feel the driver is taking risks they would not normally take, while others may have other reasons to be nervous, such as when the driver has a poor driving record. A survey of 2,000 British drivers in early 2018 found that 70% motorists found backseat driving an annoying habit and that life partners were those most likely to interfere. Although only 21% of motorists admitted to backseat driving, half said they have been in arguments due to interfering comments, and five percent admitted to accidentally jumping a red light during an argument with a backseat driver.

Use of the term extends beyond the literal and into the figurative; a "backseat driver" is someone who offers unsolicited advice, directions, or help in a situation where someone else is doing something.

== Examples in context ==
The term has been used for technology, such as devices installed in a car which observe the driving through electronic means, and inform the driver or a third party.

The Maine Department of Transportation has a web poster "Are you a Good Back Seat Driver?" asking "True or False: Being a Backseat Driver means it is okay to be noisy or distracting to the driver as long as you are giving them safety tips." The Inland Register produced by the Roman Catholic Diocese of Spokane makes use of it in a sermon: "Even our phrase 'back-seat driver' reflects this new-found freedom. Which of us who has graduated to the status of driver enjoys a passenger, especially one out of reach in the back seat, who seems to know how to drive better than we do?"

The Art of being a Backseat Driver in the San Bernardino County Sun summarizes various comments of the sort otherwise found in multiple blogs. Some are specialized, such as the Back Seat Driving blog, formerly the "LA Car Blog".

The "back-seat driver" terminology is heavily mentioned by most contesting political parties during the campaign for the 2025 Singaporean general election in hopes of balancing opposition presence in the Parliament of Singapore, though its first usage of such term was dated back in 2011, when then-Workers' Party leader Low Thia Khiang brought this analogy in one of their party's hustings.

== Related idioms ==
Armchair quarterback refers to a sports fan who thinks that they know better than the players themselves and are always eager to shout advice, whether live at the game or, more commonly, sitting at home in a chair (hence "armchair"). The term "Monday-morning quarterback" has a similar sports related etymology and more generally refers to anyone who second-guesses something.

The phrase armchair general is used to refer to somebody who is not in the military but thinks that they know better than the generals who plan military operations. This term can be used in many of the same situations as backseat driver. In Italy, the term umarell refers to men of retirement age who pass time watching roadworks, offering unwanted advice, similar to a "sidewalk superintendent" in English.
