= Ian Jarvie =

Ian Charles Jarvie (8 July 1937 – 16 May 2023) was a British-born philosopher. Trained in England, he was a long-time resident in Canada. Jarvie was educated at Dover Grammar School for Boys from 1948 to 1955. He studied at the London School of Economics under Karl Popper where he gained his B.Sc. (Econ.) and Ph.D. (1955–1962). Between 1960 and 1962 he was a Philosophy tutor at the London School of Economics, before accepting lectureships in Hong Kong and at the University of York, Ontario. Jarvie was a member of the Royal Society of Canada and managing editor of the journal Philosophy of the Social Sciences.

The philosophy of social science and the film industry were two of his main topics of research. He was a professor at York University in Toronto.

Jarvie's philosophical temperament was influenced by his former teacher, Karl Popper. Other influences included: David Hume, Bertrand Russell, and Ernest Gellner.

Further, Jarvie's philosophical method owes a debt to training in social anthropology. In this vein, he published anthropological work on the cargo cults of the South Pacific and contributed anthropological studies on the media. His adherence to functionalism in the study of the social differs from that of Durkheim (and his followers) in holding that knowledge and ideas must be presented as causal variables. Further, Jarvie contended, it must be the case that a functionalist framework with an active role for explanatory ideas requires a conception of rationality towards ideas. Politically, Jarvie was a liberal.

Ian Jarvie died on 16 May 2023, at the age of 85.

== Major works ==
- The Revolution in Anthropology, Routledge, 1967, ISBN 978-0-7100-3440-3
- Towards a Sociology of the Cinema, Routledge & Kegan Paul, 1970, ISBN 978-0-7100-6757-9
- Rationality and Relativism, Routledge & Kegan Paul, 1984, ISBN 978-0-7102-0078-5
- Thinking About Society: Theory and Practice, Boston Studies in the Philosophy of Science, vol. 93, D. Reidel, 1986, ISBN 978-90-277-2068-9
- Philosophy of the Film: Epistemology, Ontology, Aesthetics, Routledge, 1987, ISBN 978-0-7102-1016-6
- Hollywood's Overseas Campaign: The North Atlantic Movie Trade, 1920-1950, Cambridge University Press, 1992, ISBN 978-0-521-04143-0
- The social philosophy of Ernest Gellner - co-edited with John A. Hall
- The Republic of Science: the Emergence of Popper's Social View of Science, 1935-1945, Schriftenreihe zur Philosophie Karl R. Poppers und des kritischen Rationalismus, vol. 15, Rodopi, 2001, ISBN 978-90-420-1515-9

== Online papers ==
Index to Online Publications
