= Mobile donating =

Charitable donations through call or SMS

Mobile donating refers to donating (to an organization) using a mobile device, primarily via an SMS or a phone call.

== Mobile donating process ==
Premium SMS donations: Text messaging, or SMS, is the primary means of mobile donating. Mobile phone users can make donations by texting a keyword to a specific SMS short code. Keywords are determined by the fundraising organization, and usually pertain to the organization's cause or purpose. Donation amounts are predetermined, commonly at $5 or $10, and users often have a limit of how many micro-donations they can send via SMS to a single campaign in one month. After donating, users receive a confirmation text message and the donation amount is added to their monthly phone bill. Donations can take up to 90 days to be processed.

WAP donations: Mobile donating can also take place through a mobile WAP website. Cell phone users can access WAP donation pages by sending a specific text message to a designated keyword and receiving a link to the page in response, or by navigating to the page from a referring site. Upon reaching the WAP donation page, users are prompted to enter their cell phone numbers. Donations are confirmed with a text message sent to the donor's mobile phone, and the donation is added to the donor's monthly phone bill.

== Mobile fundraising campaigns ==
In the 2008 Text 2HELP campaign, the American Red Cross, in collaboration with the Wireless Foundation, raised over US$190,000 through 38,091 text messages to provide relief for victims of natural disasters such as Hurricane Gustav and Hurricane Ike. In South Africa, Nelson Mandela's charity raised $85,000 USD in July 2008 with the cooperation of Zain, a South African mobile operator, using Mandela's 90th birthday as the 'call to give'; donors from around the world could send a birthday wish and make a donation at the same time.

In support of relief efforts for the 2010 Haiti earthquake, the American Red Cross raised over $32 million within one month after the disaster via SMS donations.

== Drawbacks ==
Despite its convenience, charity watchdog group the American Institute of Philanthropy (AIP) has warned of some disadvantages to mobile donation, including concerns that service providers may charge fees or take a cut of the donations. AIP also noted that it can take as long as 120 days for a charity to actually receive a text donation, and that wireless carriers may limit the number of times per month a user can donate via text. According to the watchdog group, a charity "will generally receive your donation faster if you mail a check or donate directly to the charity online using its secure web site".

Scammers may also take advantage of natural disasters by posing as legitimate charities.
