= Hebraist =

Specialist in Jewish, Hebrew, and Hebraic studies

A Hebraist is a specialist in Jewish, Hebrew, and Hebraic studies. Specifically, British and German scholars of the 18th and 19th centuries who were involved in the study of Hebrew language and literature were commonly known by this designation, at a time when Hebrew was little understood outside practicing Jewish communities.

The 18th-century British academy was rife with pseudo-scholars, armchair anthropologists, mystics, and "enthusiasts" interested in the Hebrew language for diverse and polemical reasons. Empiricism from; the linguistic and historical discovery of Sanskrit, and the putative deciphering of Egyptian hieroglyphics by some; along with archaeological insight into the ancient Near East brought major sea-changes to Biblical history. Interest in the Hebrew language grew out of raging debates over the historicity of Noah's deluge and other Bible narratives, and even whether Hebrew is the most ancient language of the world taught to Adam by God himself. Some Hebraists held posts in academies or churches, while others were strictly amateur.

Some Hebraists proposed theories that the vowels in the text of the Hebrew Bible, superadded to the text by the scribal tradition, were a Jewish conspiracy to mask the true meaning of Scripture. As a result, a genre of Hebraic scholarship concentrated on running the words of the Biblical text together, removing the vowels, dissecting the words in different ways, and adding alternate vowels so as to give an alternate sense to the text.

== See also ==
- Assyriology
- Biblical studies
- Christian Hebraist
- Egyptology
- Hebraism
- Hebrew literature
- Jewish studies
- Muslim Hebraists
- Orientalism
- Semitic studies
