= Clarissa Munger Badger =

American painter

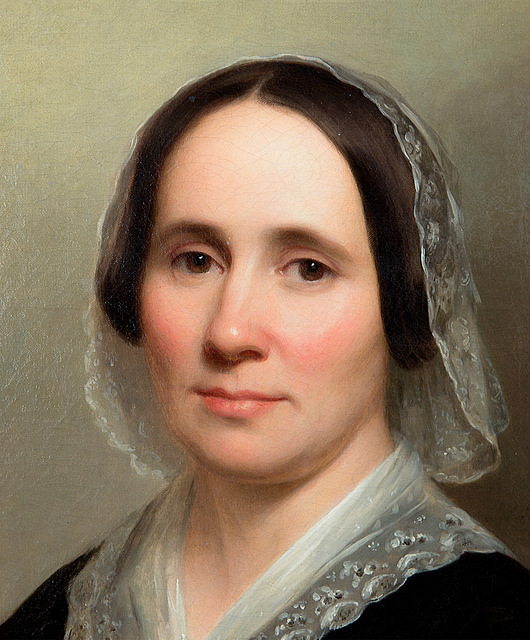
- portrait by Nathaniel Jocelyn
- Born: Clarissa Munger; 1806; East Guilford, Connecticut
- Died: 1889 (aged 82–83)
- Resting place: West Cemetery, Madison, Connecticut
- Known for: botanical painting
- Spouse: Milton Badger

Clarissa Munger Badger (20 May 1806 – 14 December 1889) was a mid 19th century American botanical illustrator best known for three volumes of flower paintings accompanied by poetry. She also painted on textiles.

== Family ==
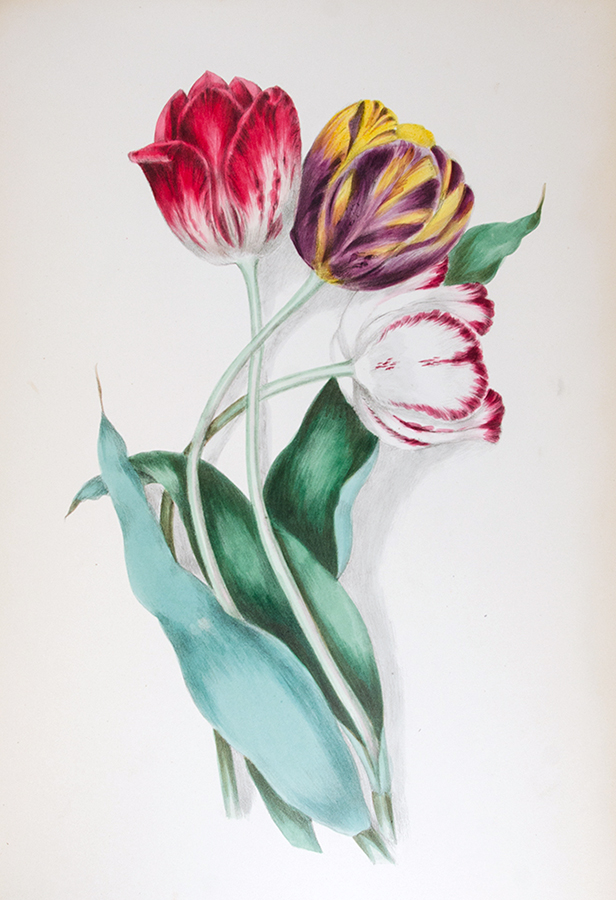
Clarissa Munger Badger, lithograph of tulips from her 1867 book Floral Belles from the Green-House and Garden.

Clarissa W. Munger was born in East Guilford, Connecticut, in 1806 to George Munger, a portrait painter and engraver, and Parnel Kelsey Munger. Clarissa, her older brother George, and her younger sister Caroline all become artists as well, with Caroline specializing in portraits like her father and Clarissa in botanical art.

In 1828, she married the Rev. Milton Badger, pastor of the South Church in Andover, Massachusetts and later the associate secretary of the American Home Missionary Society, a job requiring him to spend time in the western United States. They had five children, of whom two survived to adulthood, both becoming doctors. Milton developed Bright's disease, and the couple moved back Madison, Connecticut, where Clarissa was widowed in 1873.

== Works ==
In 1848, Clarissa Munger Badger privately published A Forget-Me-Not: Flowers from Nature with Selected Poetry under the name C. M. Badger. This was a volume of poetry by William Cullen Bryant, Lydia Sigourney, Mary Howitt, and others illustrated with 13 of her flower paintings. This may have provided a model for her 1859 book Wild Flowers Drawn and Colored from Nature (informally known as The Wild Flowers of America), which was illustrated with 22 plates of individual common flowers such as trailing arbutus, purple violet, cardinal flower, and harebell. It also included poems, thought in this case to have been written by Badger herself, together with an introductory poem by Sigourney. The poet Emily Dickinson owned a copy of this book. The plates were widely reproduced at the time, contributing to Badger's reputation as a top-rank botanical artist.

In her 1859 book Wild Flowers Drawn and Colored from Nature, not only was made up of her illustrations but of her poetry as well. In her poems, she personifies the flowers. She wrote in first person, making it seem that the flower that was drawn on the next page was telling you the story of how what it did or how it lived. Like in the excerpt from “The Sweet Brier” poem:

“...And often in the hallow’d spot,

Where pale the mourner weeps,

I breathe my fragrance o’er the grave

Where youthful beauty sleeps

Thus, year by year, my little charms

I cheerfully impact

Pleased when I check a sorrowing tear

Or cheer one lonely heart.”

Each of the flowers she had in her book also had a poem to go with them. Such as the “Fringed Gentian” and “Harebell” as well.

Clarissa's third book, Floral Belles from the Green-House and Garden, was published in 1867 with 16 hand-colored lithographic plates typically showing two or three flowers in clusters or bouquets. As with her first book, the flower paintings were accompanied by poetry, in this case poems about the flowers depicted.

A sketch written when Badger was 75 years old, remarks on the "feeling and delicacy" of her watercolors and remarks that she was still painting flowers at that advanced age. The popularity of Badger's graceful, stylized paintings in her own day was "dwarfed by her male counterparts; only now is she being applauded as a fine botanical artist".

Her style was different from her male counterparts. Some of her pieces focus on a single flower, but many times she would include many flowers. This was rarely done as many of the pieces of the era were for study of one plant not them as a group. Badger was showing a scene instead of just single plants. She gave each piece a great amount of detail and stayed as true to nature as she possibly could. She used shadows and color variation to create both contrast and make the flowers look very life-like. Along with illustrations and poems, Badger painted her flowers on textiles. These, like her illustrations, are very life-like and show that she had paid attention to details and the shadows of the pieces.

Recent research has revealed that Badger also painted on textiles. Extant works include a quilt with some panels featuring hand-painted flowers, and a silk scarf with roses painted at one end and morning glories at the other.

Portraits of Badger and her husband were painted in 1846-47 by Nathaniel Jocelyn.
