= Warmonger =

A warmonger is someone who instigates war, or advocates war over peaceful solutions.

Warmonger may also refer to:

- Warmonger (novel), a 2002 novel based on the Doctor Who television series
- Warmonger: Operation Downtown Destruction, a 2007 first-person shooter computer game developed by NetDevil
- Warmonger, a villain from the cartoon series Mighty Max
- General Warmonger, a character from the 2009 animated film Monsters vs. Aliens
- A hero from the 2017 game For Honor

== See also ==
- War hawk
