= Christian Mounger =

American artist

Christian Mounger is an American artist. He is known for works in the field of photography, collage, and installation art.

== Education ==
Mounger holds a BFA degree in photography from Memphis College of Art, a BA in English literature from Rhodes College, and a MFA degree in sculpture from Claremont Graduate University.

He has worked as an exhibition and graphic designer at the Huntington Library Art Collections and Botanical Gardens and holds an associate professor position at Otis College of Art and Design.

== Group exhibitions ==
Mounger has participated in a group exhibition featuring work by teaching staff at Otis College of Art and Design. Other group shows include the Los Angeles Municipal Art Gallery, Carl Berg Gallery, Joslyn Fine Arts Center, Pomona College Museum of Art, Chapman University's Guggenheim Gallery, Fullerton Museum Center, Irvine Fine Arts Center, and Woodbury University.

He has also exhibited his work at Abel Joseph Gallery in Brussels, Belgium, Lidovy Dum, in Prague, Czechoslovakia and at the Croatia/Los Angeles Exchange in Dubrovnik, Croatia
