= John Ross Key (artist) =

American painter

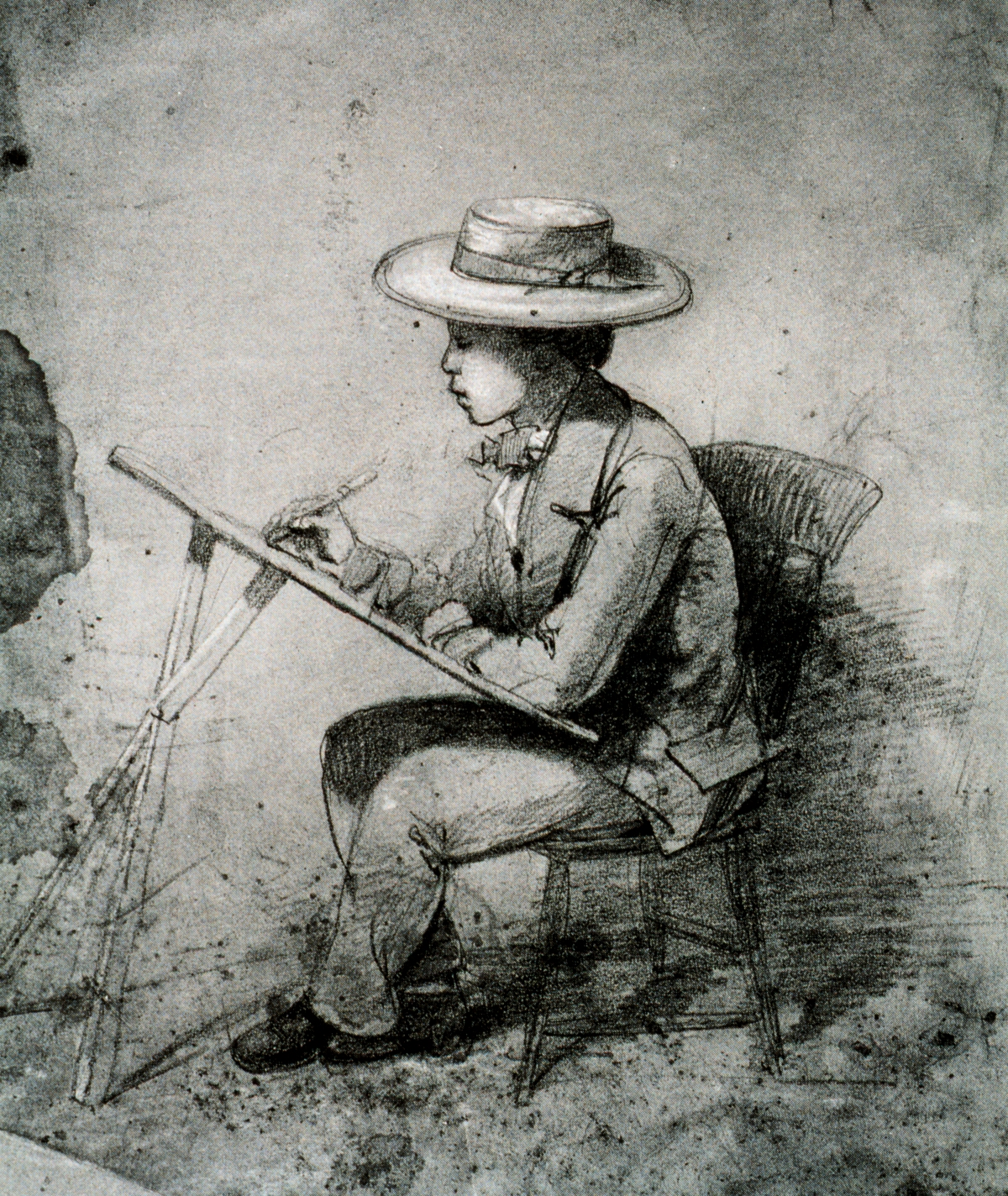
Portrait of John Ross Key in 1854 by James McNeill Whistler.

John Ross Key (16 July 1832 in Hagerstown, Maryland – 24 March 1920 in Baltimore) was an American artist most known for his frontier landscapes.

Key was the grandson of Francis Scott Key, author of "The Star-Spangled Banner".

== Career ==
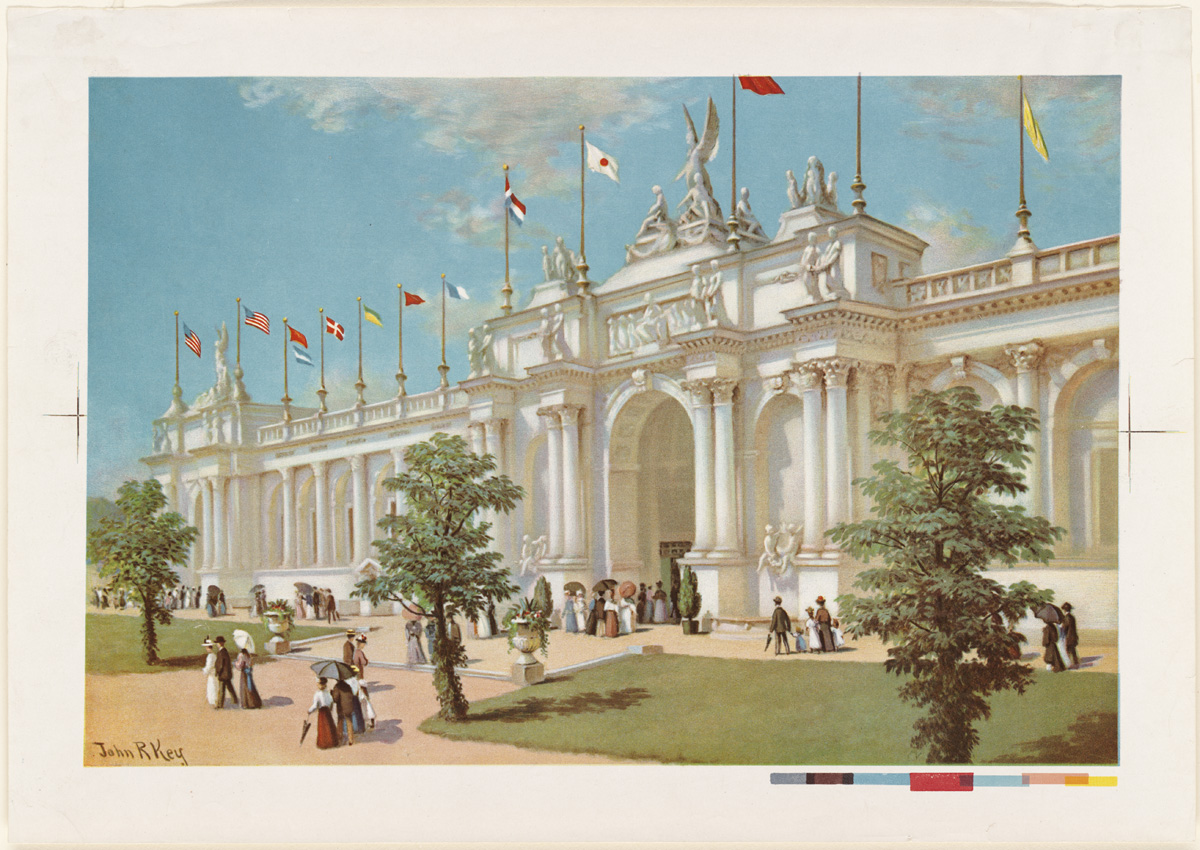
Chromolithograph of John Ross Key's painting of the 1893 Chicago Exposition.

From 1853 to 1856, Key was a draughtsman and map maker for the US Coast Survey in Washington, D.C.

In 1859, he was a cartographer working for the Lander Expedition where he drew trails of Nevada and Wyoming.

In 1863, Key was commissioned as second lieutenant in the Corps of Engineers at Charleston, where he recorded the federal siege in his paintings.

In 1869, Key moved to the East Coast and became a member of the Society of Washington Artists and the Boston Art Club.

From 1870 to 1873, Key had a studio in San Francisco. In May 1871, his work was part of the first exhibition by the San Francisco Art Association.

Between 1873 and 1875, Key studies in Munich, Germany and Paris, France. When he returned to the United States, he worked in Chicago, St. Louis, New York, Baltimorem and Boston. In 1876, his painting "The Golden Gate, San Francisco" won a gold medal in the Philadelphia Centennial Exhibition. The next year one hundred of his paintings were on display in the Boston Athenaeum.

Many of Key's works are panoramic views, landscapes, and outdoor scenes.

== Retirement and death ==
Key moved to Washington, D.C., in 1908. He stayed in the city until 1917 and moved to Baltimore. He lived in Baltimore until his death in 1920, aged 88.

== Exhibitions ==
- White House Historical Association
- Fine Art Museums of San Francisco
- University of Michigan Art Museum
- Missouri History Museum
- Morris Museum of Art
- Greenville County Museum of Art
- National Academy of Design
- The Pennsylvania Academy of the Fine Arts
- The Boston Athenaeum
- Mechanics Institute
- The Boston Art Club
- Corcoran Gallery
- Society of Independent Artists
