= Monger (surname) =

Monger is a surname. Notable people with the surname include:

- Adrian Monger (1932–2016), Australian Olympic rower
- Billy Monger (born 1999), British racing driver
- Ceri Monger, bass player with New Model Army
- Christopher Monger (born 1950), Welsh film director
- Frederick Monger (1863–1919), Australian politician
- George Monger (1840–1887), English recipient of the Victoria Cross
- James Monger (21st century), Canadian geologist
- John Monger (1831–1892), Australian politician
- John Henry Monger Snr (1802–1867), migrant to Western Australia in 1829
- Tom Monger, harpist with Florence and the Machine

== See also ==
- Munger (surname)
