= George Munger (artist) =

American painter and engraver (1781–1825)

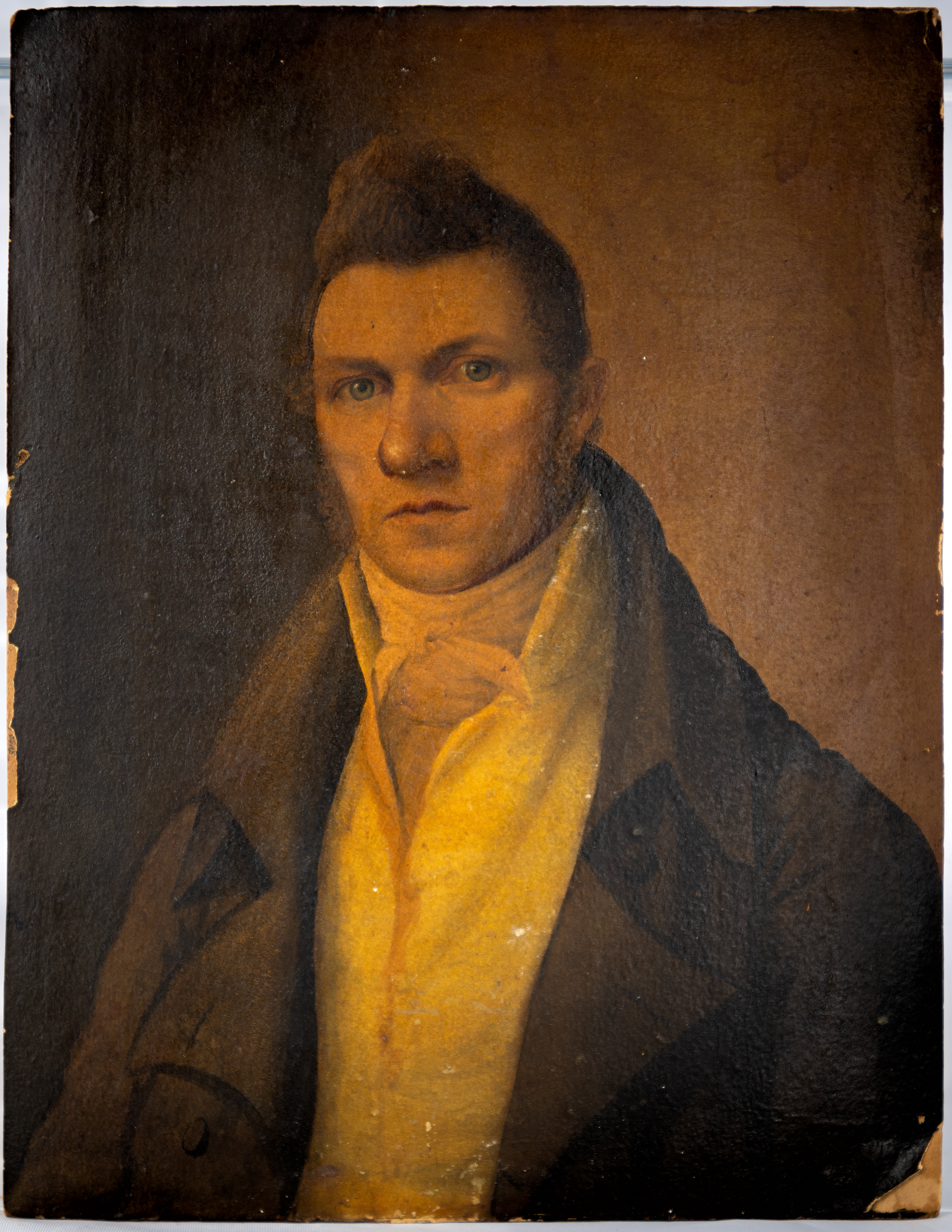
- self-portrait
- Born: February 17, 1781; Guilford
- Died: July 2, 1825; New Haven
- Occupations: Engraver, painter
- Children: Clarissa Munger Badger, Caroline Washburn, George Nicholas Munger

George Munger (1781–1825) was an early 19th-century American painter and engraver best known for watercolors of the White House and the U.S. Capitol after their burning by British troops in the War of 1812.

== Biography ==
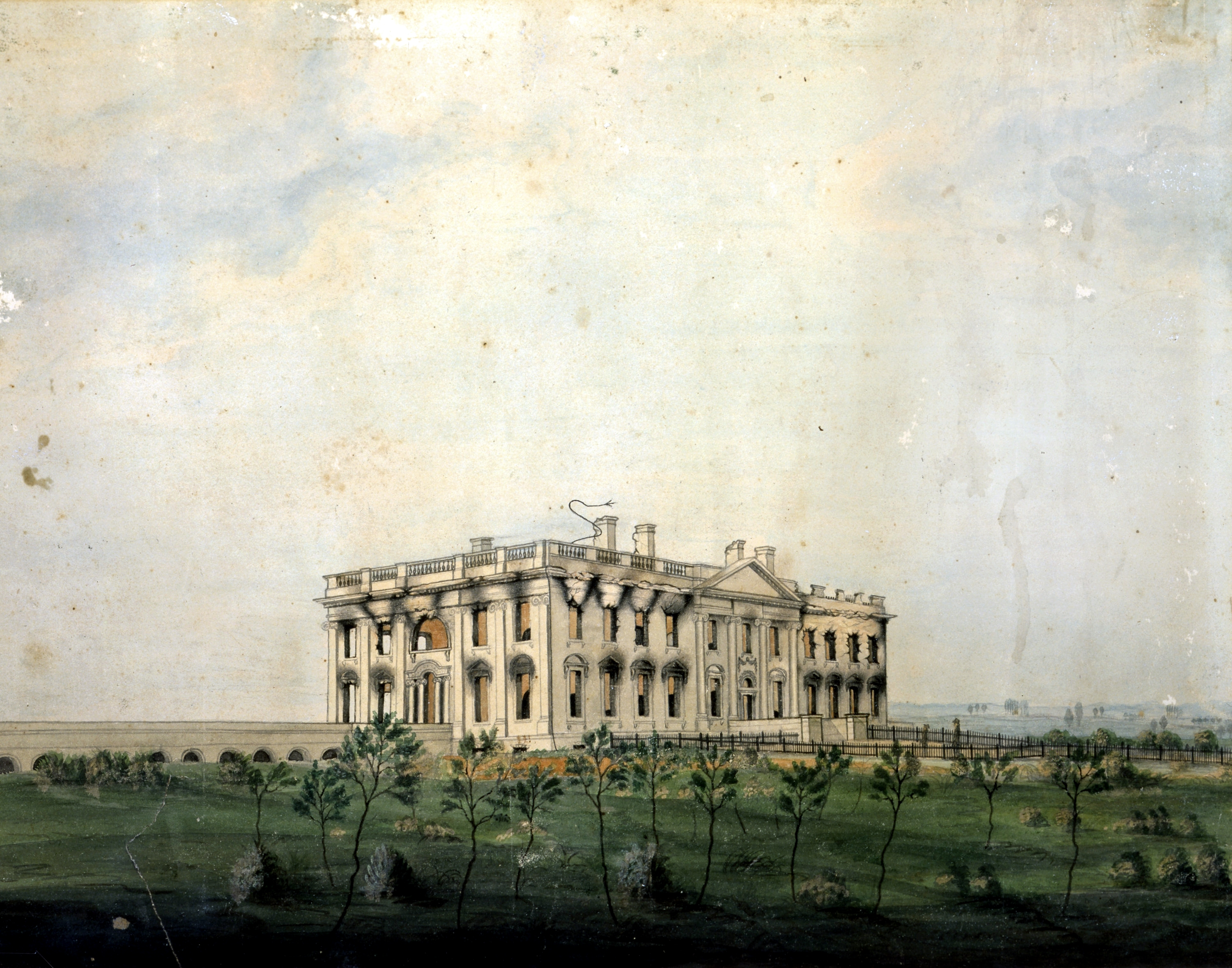
The President's House, watercolor by George Munger, 1814-1815.

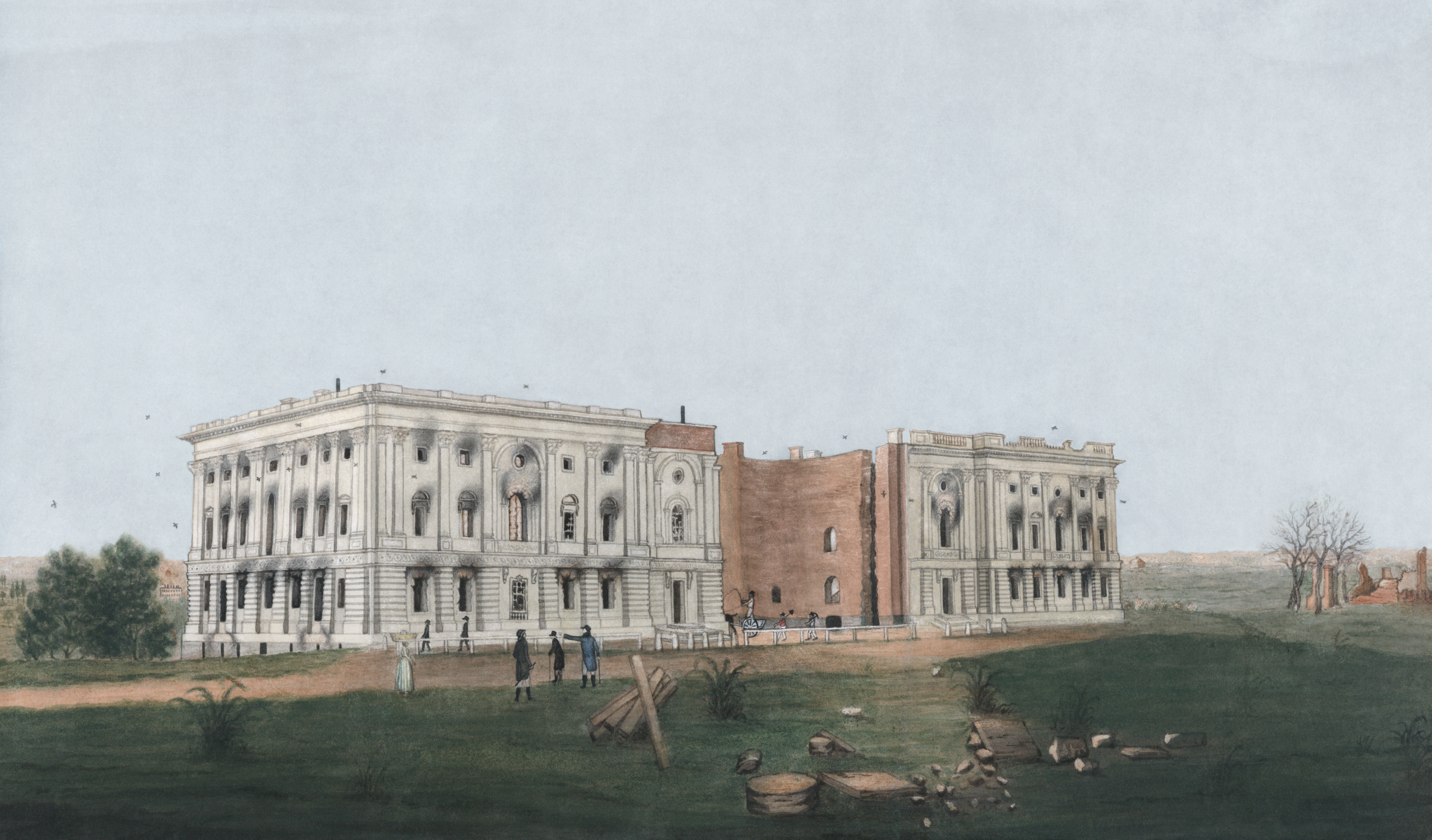
Watercolor by George Munger showing the ruins of the U.S. Capitol, 1814.

George Munger was born Feb. 17, 1781, in Guilford, Connecticut, the son of Josiah Munger, a farmer. He became an engraver and painter; he was also a teacher at times. According to one source a bad attack of smallpox led him to give up painting for about a decade between roughly 1804 and 1814. He married Parnel Kelsey in 1802, and three of their children—George Nicholas Munger, Caroline Munger Washburn, and Clarissa Munger Badger—all became artists themselves. A distant cousin of his by another line of descent from Josiah Munger was the late 19th century American landscape painter Gilbert Munger.

Munger specialized in portraits and miniatures, although his most famous paintings today are a pair of landscapes. His watercolor entitled The President's House was painted following the fire of August 24, 1814, set by British troops during their invasion of Washington, D.C. in the War of 1812. The painting shows the burned shell of the White House from a distance, starkly emphasizing its ruin and isolation in the surrounding landscape of sparse trees. The view is from a public common to the northeast of the White House. A curious detail in the painting is an S-shaped curve on the rooftop that at first glance appears to be a stray hair caught on the paper. An explanation for this is offered by historian William Kloss writing for the White House Historical Association:

It is most readily interpreted as part of a lightning protection system. Not a lightning rod, given its length, but rather part of the metallic conductor that encircled the roof, now torn from its mooring.

Munger's watercolor of the then-unfinished U.S. Capitol building, painted around the same time, shows fire and smoke damage done to both the Senate and House of Representatives wings by the British attempt to burn the building down. Clearly visible as well is the partial destruction of the central rotunda, with its facade and roof gone.

The President's House is now in the collection of the White House, while the painting of the U.S. Capitol is in the Library of Congress.
