= Micro-donation =

Small charitable donations

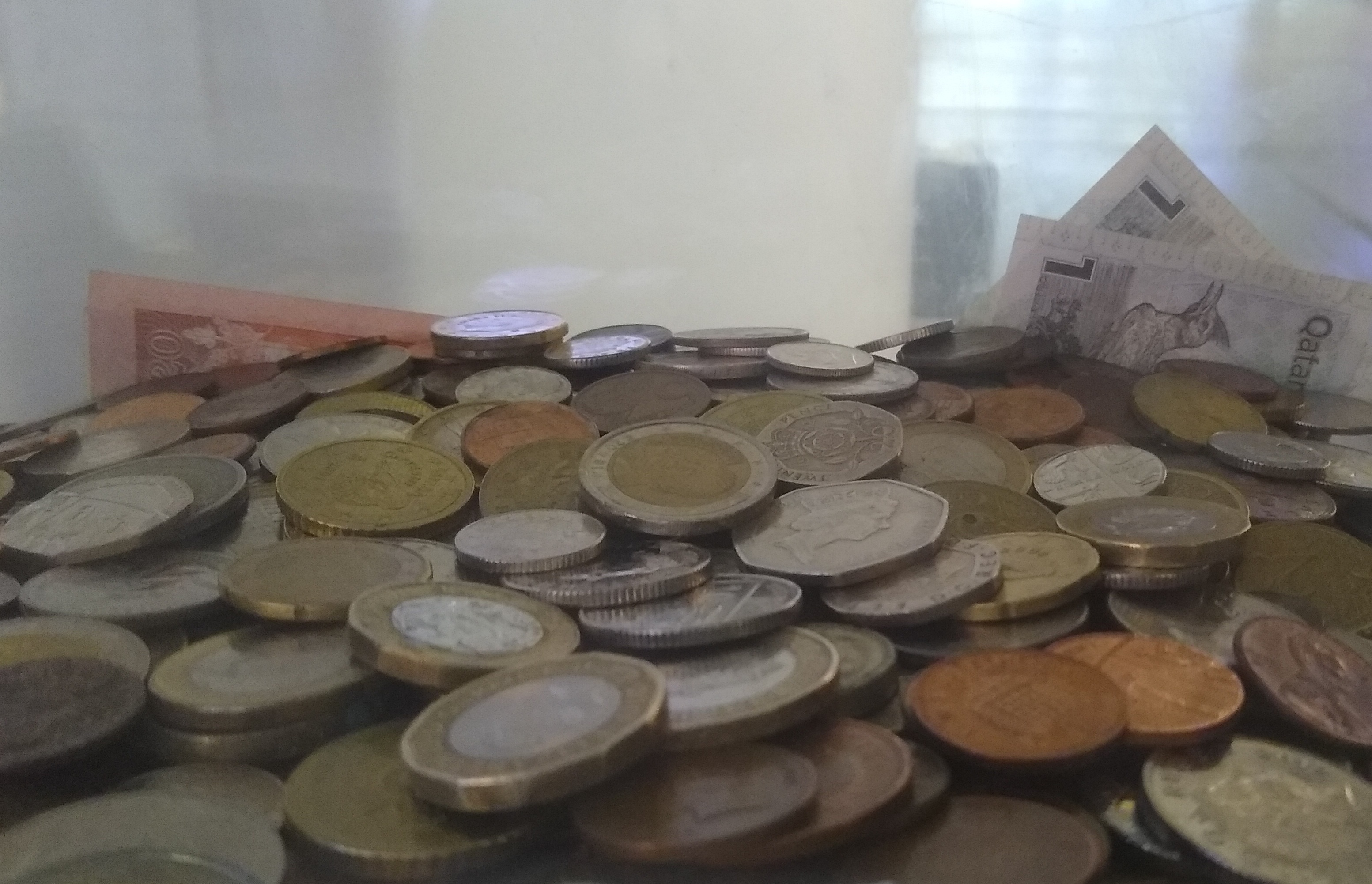
Donations of spare change in various currencies at Heathrow Airport

Micro-donation or microphilanthropy is a form of charitable donation that is small in the donated amount. In the past, micro-donations have been used most effectively by companies collecting spare change at registers and checkouts. Recently, this form of philanthropy has become more popular with the advent of online and mobile donating.

In addition to the more traditional forms of donating, like giving directly from person to person, both the internet and mobile-phones have become more accepted by the public for collecting donations.

Micro-donations of $200 or less have made up an ever-larger share of nomination fundraising in the three United States presidential primary elections since 2000. (In this measurement a person who donates $190 twice to a candidate has given two micro-donations, but is not a micro-donor). Micro-donations accounted for 25% of the total donations for the United States presidential election in 2000. This figure rose to 34% in 2004 and 38.8% in 2008.

== Supporting technology ==
Microphilanthropy requires the ability to deal with a large number of small interactions efficiently. If a successful approach also includes implementing a fundraising drive that utilizes microphilanthropic resources connected to a specific charity, the approach must also include a structure or "middleman" technology that allows for an effective, efficient aggregation and distribution of microphilanthropic donations. For example, the US-based nonprofit Zidisha offers an eBay-style peer-to-peer microlending platform, which uses internet and mobile phone technology to deliver services between lenders and borrowers directly across international borders without local intermediaries.

== See also ==
- Microcredit
- Mobile donating
