= Armchair theorizing =

Analyzing existing work, without new data

Armchair theory or armchair philosophy is an approach to providing new developments in a field that does not involve analysis of empirical (real-world) data. The term is typically pejorative, implying such scholarship is weak, frivolous, and disconnected from reality.

Armchair scholarship is often contrasted with the scientific method, which involves the active investigation of nature through data collection or testing and developing rigorous mathematical models. Anthropologist Bronisław Malinowski was a major critic whose views are often summarized in the saying "[come] off the verandah", encouraging fieldwork and participant observation.

== See also ==
- A priori and a posteriori
- Logical truth
- Meta-analysis
- Thought experiment
