= Keyboard warrior =

Internet term

Keyboard warrior is a term that refers to a person who makes abusive or aggressive posts on the internet, typically one who conceals their true identity.

== History ==
The term was first used in the 1960s, with the earliest known evidence of it appearing in the Daily Gleaner in Fredericton, Canada in 1968.

This term used in the early to mid-2000s to refer to online gamers, often viewed through a particular stereotype: "The mythic keyboard warrior," the International Herald Tribune reported in 2006, "is usually portrayed as a gangly teenage boy hypnotized in the moonlight before a computer screen flickering with assorted night elves, dwarves and the forsaken undead." The term came to be associated with online activism, including by those using the internet as a tool of resistance in more repressive environments.

In 2025, Filipino senator Francis Tolentino revealed that the Philippine-based public relations firm InfinitUs Marketing Solutions, Inc. had entered into a contract with the Chinese embassy in the Philippines in 2023 agreeing to hire "keyboard warriors" dedicated to spreading pro-China messaging on social media.

== In China ==
In China, for nearly a decade, the term Chinese: 键盘侠; pinyin: jiànpán-xiá; lit. 'keyboard knight' refers to people who make abusive or aggressive posts without revealing their identities. The term has often been used by state media to criticize those who speak up online without acting with a sense of justice when facing real-life situations, as well as those who, even by voicing legitimate criticisms, are seen to unfairly criticize the Party-state.

== Other ==
US president Donald Trump has praised his supporters as "great keyboard warriors", calling them, "far more brilliant" than anyone working in the advertising industry.
