= Bobo brand =

Term for unpopular, inexpensive brand

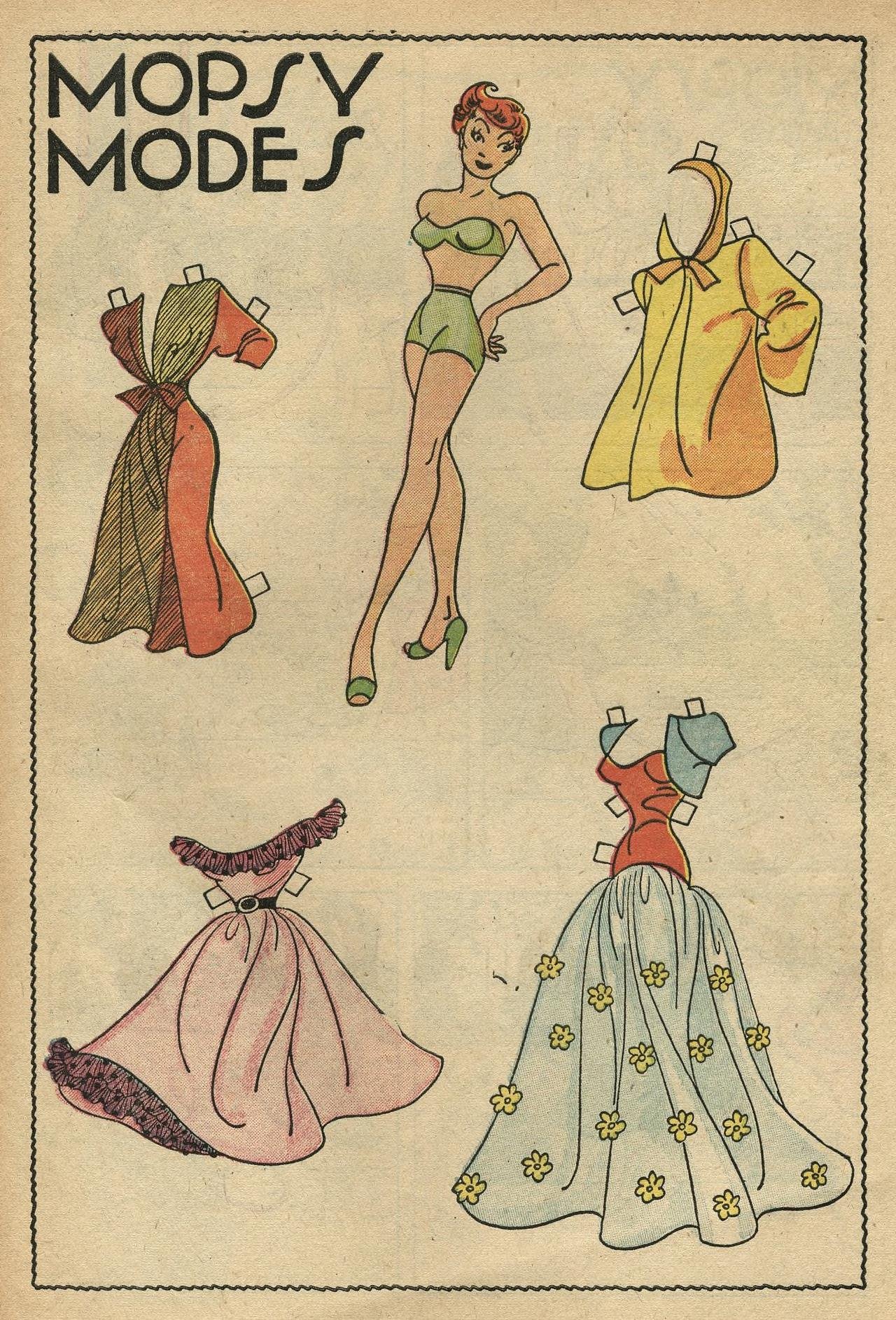
A woman, seen as a mannequin, tries to find the perfect dress to wear

"Bobo Brand" is an informal name used to refer to a product that is sold inexpensively under an unpopular brand name. These products are perceived as inferior to better-known brands. Though they are less expensive, they are often not lower quality.

The expression "Bobo brand" does not refer to a specific brand. It describes a lifestyle: an action of consumption that ratifies the membership to the Bobo group.

== Etymology ==
The term Bobo is a contraction for bourgeois-bohème. Bourgeois, from Late Latin "burgus" which means "castle" (in medieval Latin ‘fortified town’), means "belonging to the middle class". Bohème, derived from the French word Bohême is a compound of Proto-Germanic *haimaz ("home") and Boio- ‘the Boii’, the Celtic tribe previously inhabiting the area. It refers to a person with financial means and liberal, left-wing political views, with musical, artistic, literary or spiritual pursuits and a Parisian attitude.

== History and sociology ==
The term "bobo" was sourced in the mid 1970s, before David Brooks in his book Bobos in Paradise (2000). This identifies the rich progressives living in Greenwich Village in New York as a contraction of "bourgeois bohemian". The expression was used to refer to a particular French socio-economic group.

The Swinging Sixties witnessed disputes between middle-class culture and the counterculture, or in Bourdieu's view the higher status group and the lower status group. The creation of a third class put an end to this cultural war: the bourgeois bohemians or Bobos emerged. Among them, there were highly educated folk who had one foot in the bohemian world of creativity and another foot in the bourgeois realm of ambition and worldly success.

== Bobo culture ==
=== France ===
In France, the term "radical chic" was used to indicate the exponents of the so-called "gauche caviar", a term used for the first time by the French far-right press to label the left-wing elite in power since 1981. By introducing the term "bobo", not only did it end up semantically superimposing the expression "gauche caviar", it also labeled the other leftist voters who had cultural capital without the corresponding economic capital.

Less political and more materialistic than the group of caviar socialist, French Bobos design their lifestyles in a mix that includes luxury, middle-class classics, and student-style cheap 'n' chic. Bobos, referred to by The Guardian as an "enlightened elite," typically hold wealth while also simultaneously expressing anti-establishment sentiments.

=== China ===
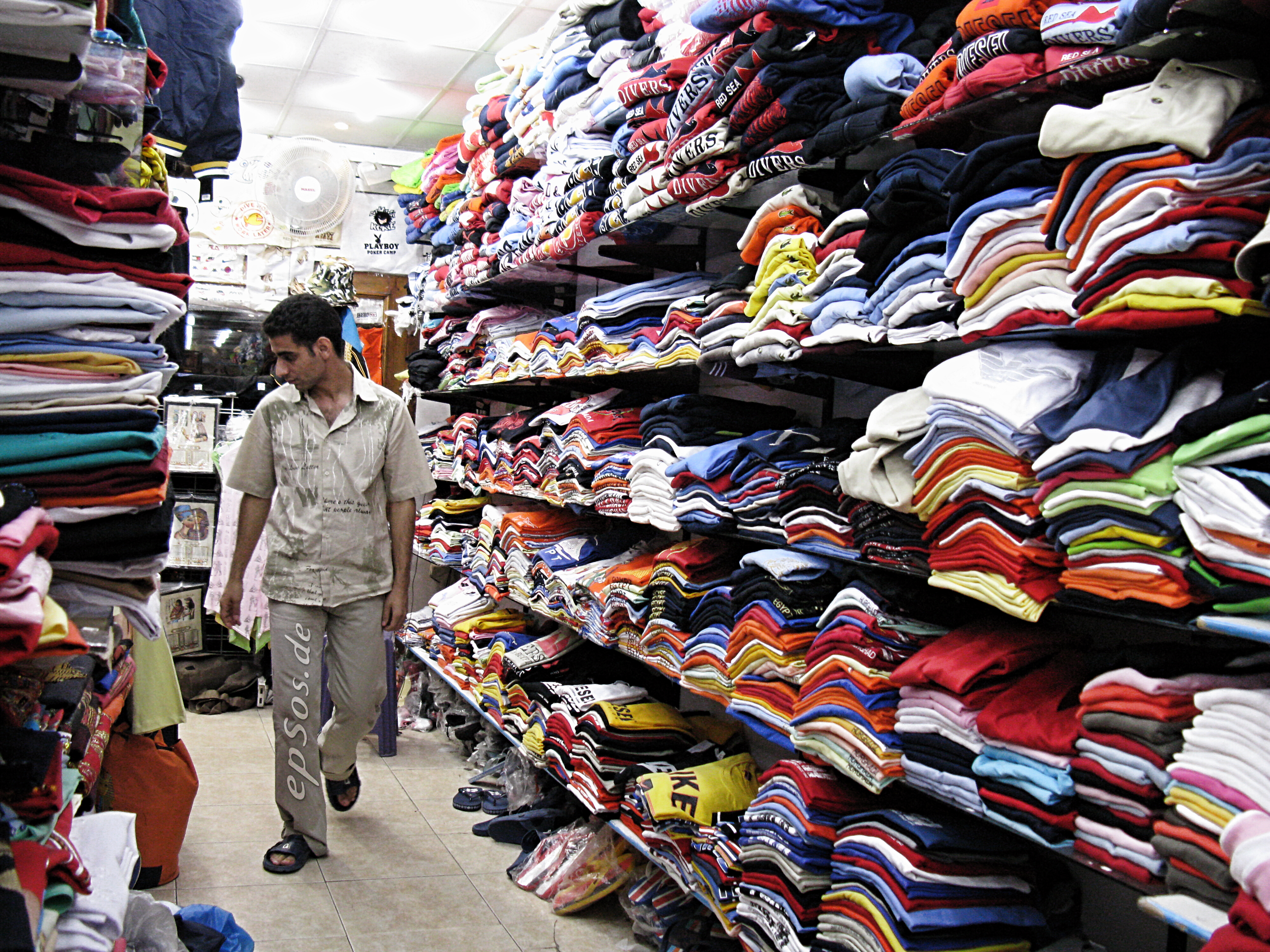
Chinese popular t-shirts store

In 2002, the Bobo spirit touched a nerve in China's rising social élite. Urban China has experienced social trends that usually emerge in the West in post-affluent societies where luxury is less about displaying wealth and more about simply enjoying luxury for its own sake. The "bobo phenomenon" provided China an opportunity to reconcile materialism with spirituality and élite status with egalitarian ideals, in a country where the bourgeois is statistically small and the bohemian group is non-existent.

The French and the American concept of Bobos involves seeking products of exquisite taste and quality, or products that display the essence of a free spirit. The main contrast is that for the former two cultures, Boboism is a class formation whereas for China it is a pop culture and marketing phenomenon.

== Bobo Consumerism ==
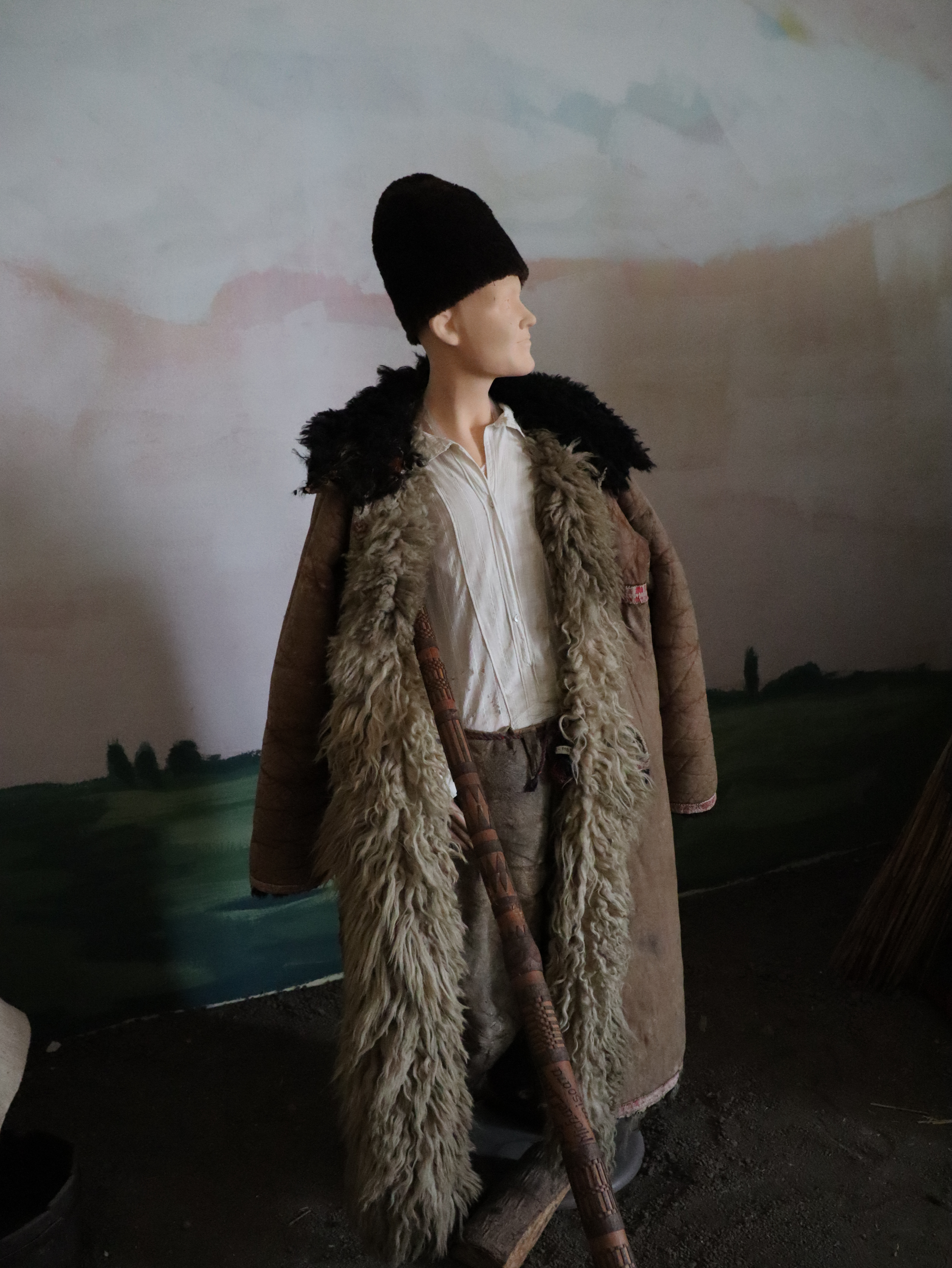
Refinement in bobos' style

Bobos reject "commercial" values for the sake of "natural" values. These values are reflected in their consumption patterns. Their consumption is part of their process of self-creation, aimed at claiming their status. In this perception consumption becomes a symbolic act rather than a necessity.

From a consumerist point of view, they are not likely to consider themselves within the mass consumption model, although their consumption patterns seem to portrait them as paradoxical. On the one hand, they appreciate expensive products and services, on the other hand, they are worried about the environment. They describe themselves as sustainable consumers, but their appreciation for organic products and eco-friendly services appears to be more a way to claim their own social status and showing their identity, rather than a consequence of actual environmental concern. Their longing for sustainability is incoherent compared with their actual consumerism.

It is only through particular material objects that the Bobo lifestyle can be manifested. The Bobo orientation towards products includes artisanal, custom-made or locally produced commodities as opposed to mass-produced goods.

Bobos tend to elevate everyday objects and make them aesthetically pleasing. They search for goods and services with large attention to small details in order to satisfy their need to be perceived organic and anti-consumerist.

Generally speaking, when it comes to fashion, Bobos avoids well-known luxury brands and opt instead for lesser known designers. They aim for a style that gives an impression that they do not care too much about fashion, despite the amount of thought and money they invest into their looks.

== Examples ==
The need for "natural" values and the creativity of Bobos have started a lifestyle that has influenced various life contexts, from the way of dressing to the local production of food. A modern example is the Swedish glassware brand BOBO which aims to offer contemporary glassware that combines the worldly ambitions of the lite through superior quality with the rebelliousness of hipsters through minimalistic design.

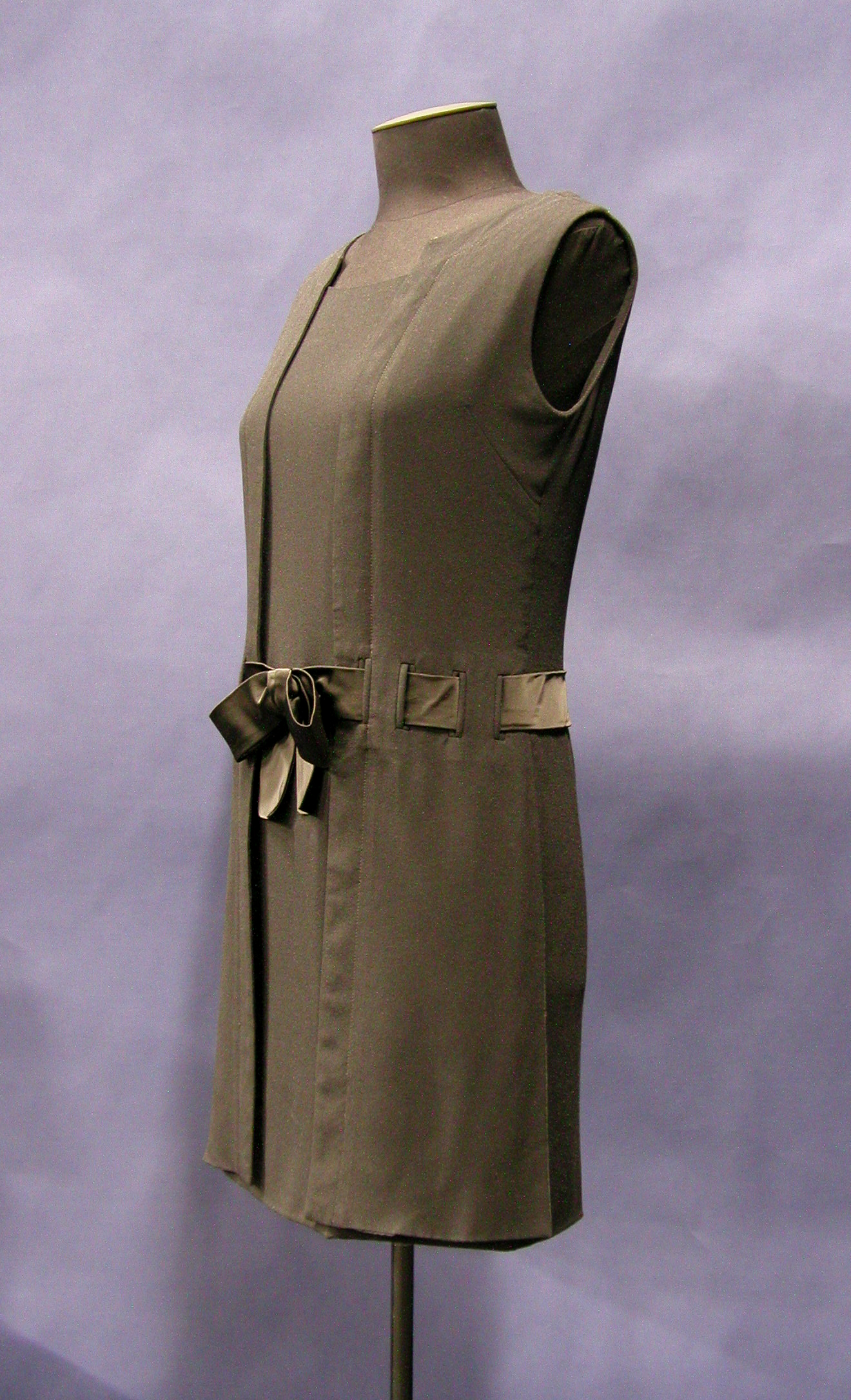
Custom made dress

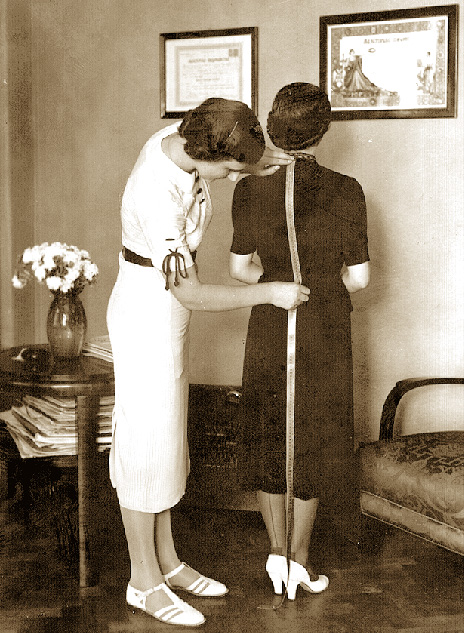
Tailor fitting

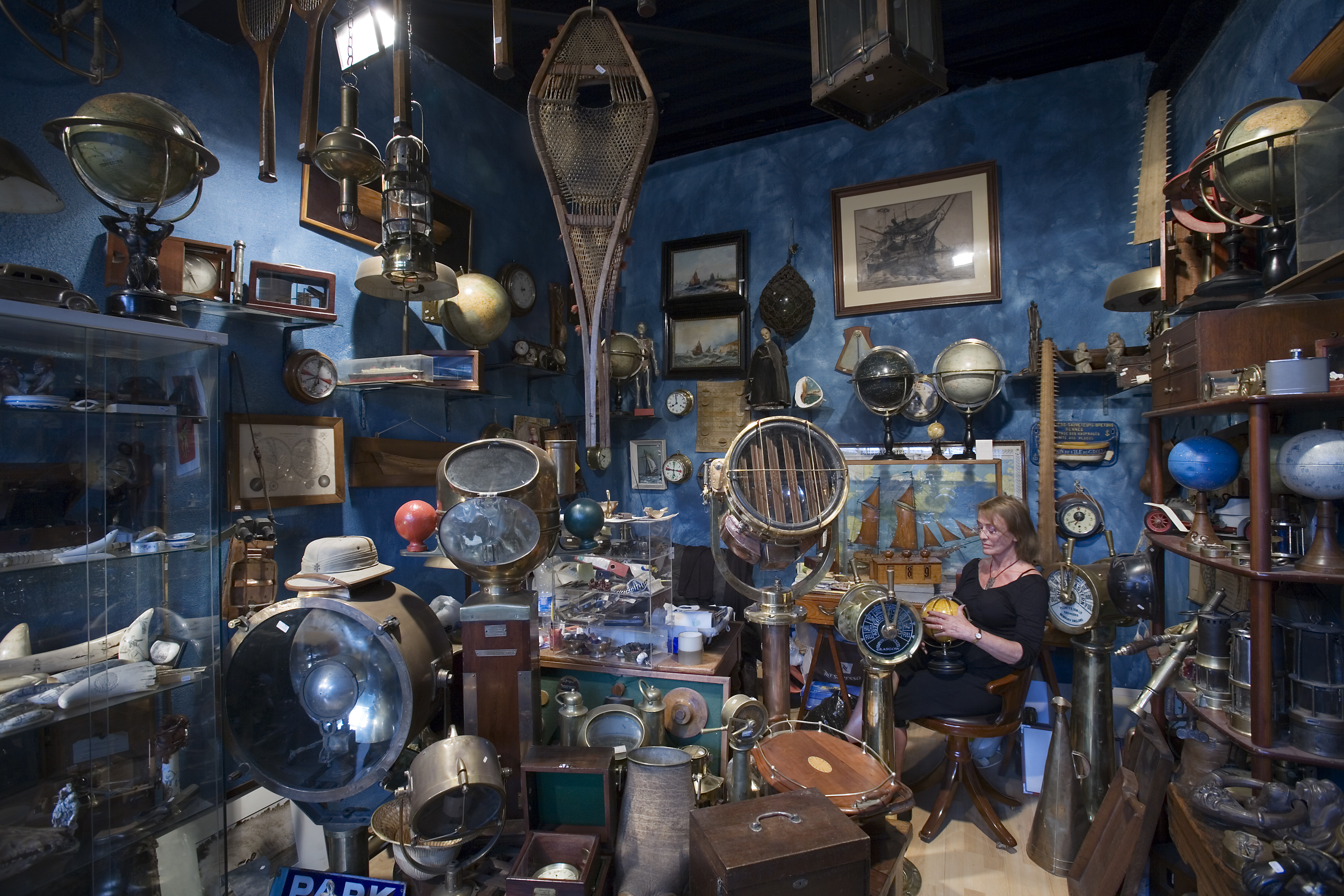
Vintage store

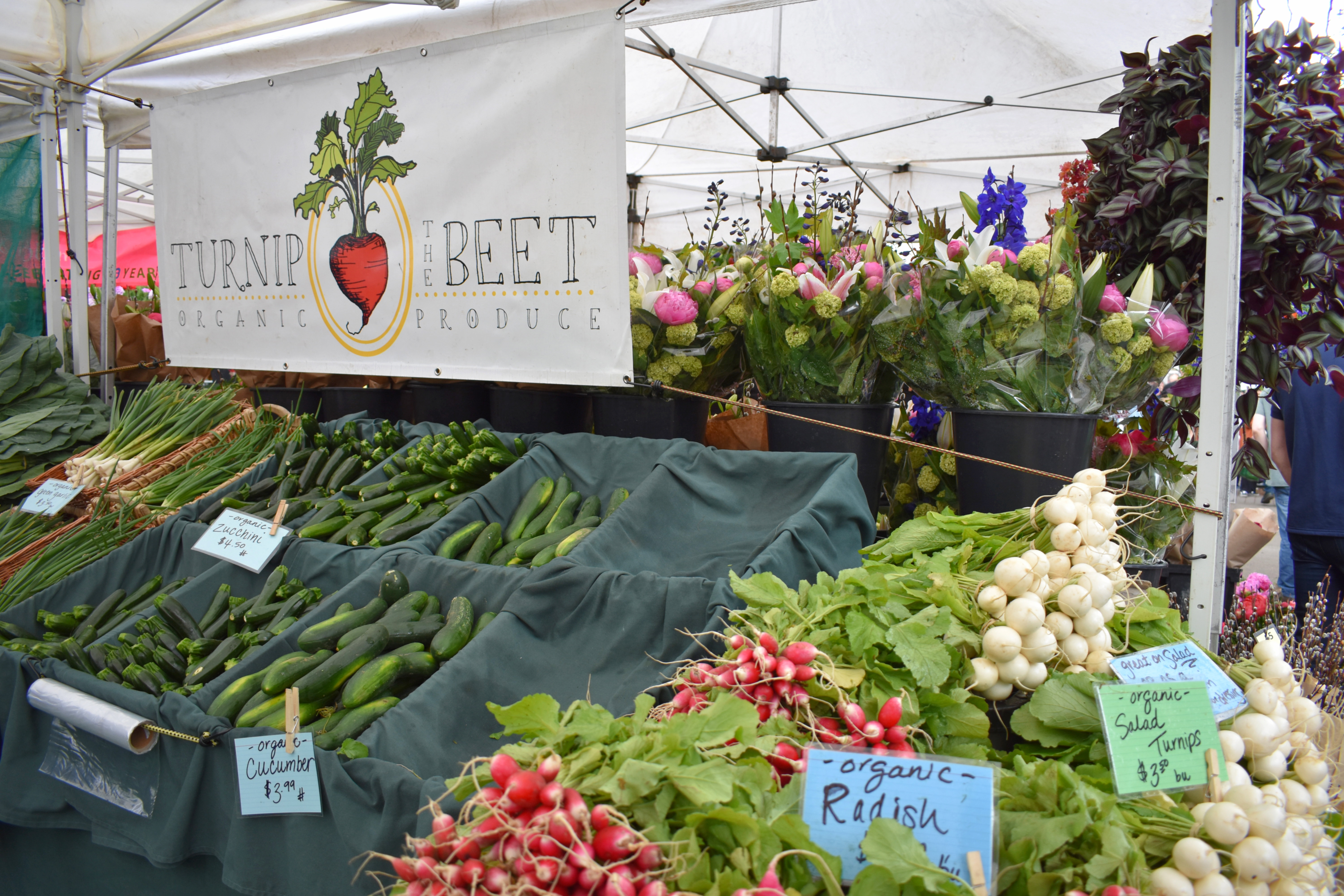
Local organic food market

== See also ==
- Legal fake
- Hipster
- Yuppie
- Radical chic
- Counterfeit consumer goods
- Gauche caviar
- Gentrification
- Urban society in China
