= Champagne socialist =

Pejorative political term

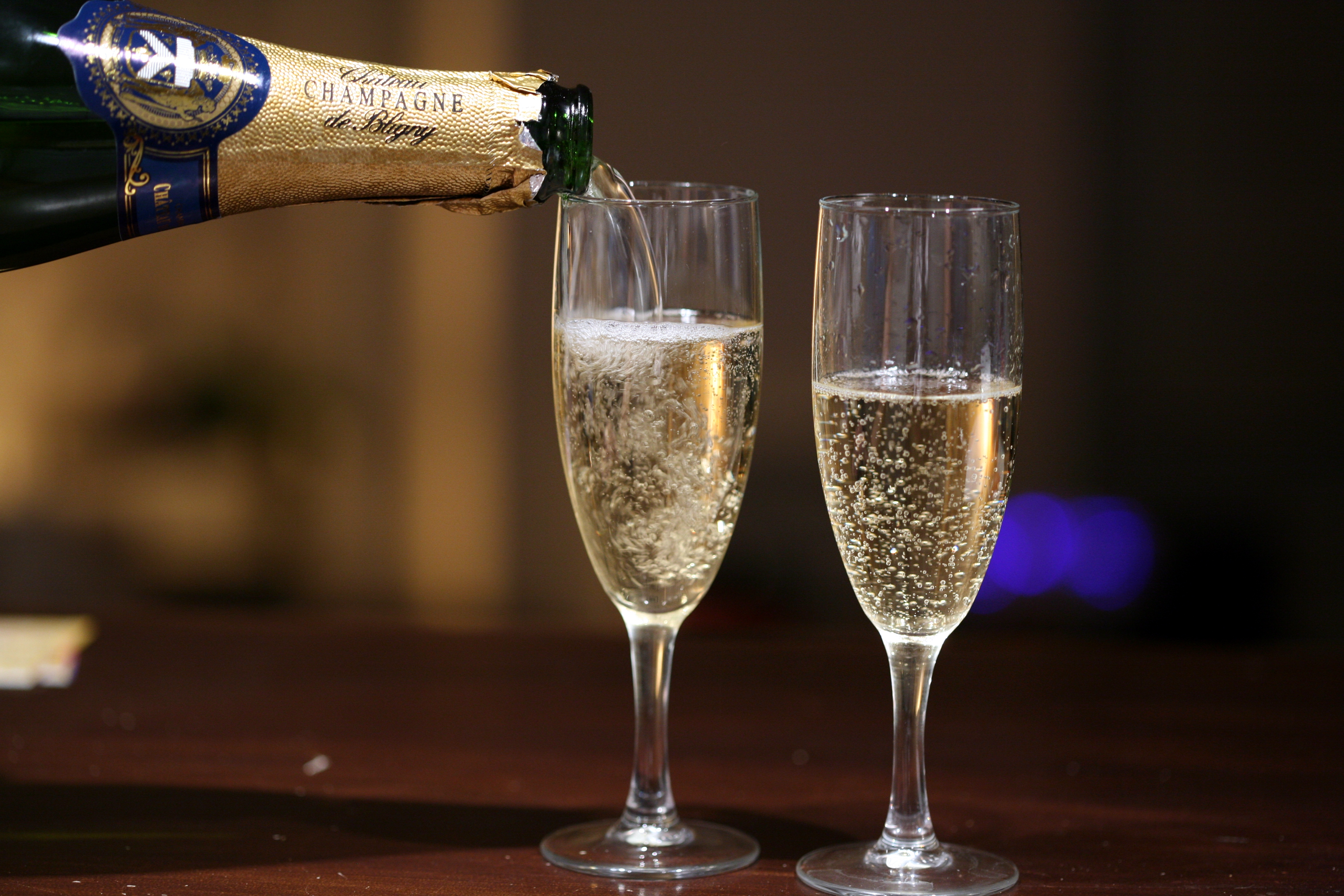
The term references champagne as a symbol of affluence.

Champagne socialist is a political term commonly used in the United Kingdom. It is a popular epithet that implies a degree of hypocrisy, and it is closely related to the concept of the liberal elite. The phrase is generally used to describe self-identified anarchists, communists, and socialists whose luxurious lifestyles, metonymically including consumption of champagne, are ostensibly in conflict with their political beliefs. In more inflammatory contexts, it can be exaggerated to describe privileged individuals who express support for any policy or cause at all that addresses economic inequality.

== Meaning ==
"Champagne socialist" is a pejorative which refers to the perceived hypocrisy between advocating for socialist ideals and enjoying affluent lifestyles.

Ed Rooksby writing for The Guardian says that the apparent contradiction depends on how socialism and equality are understood. He writes that socialism does not necessarily mean absolute equality, but rather where everyone has equal access to the resources they require in order to flourish.

== United Kingdom ==
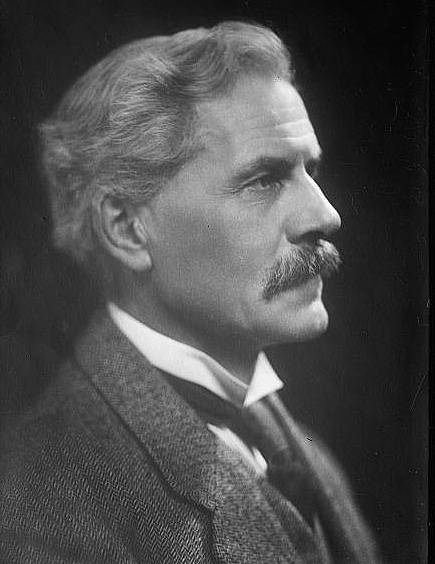
British Prime Minister Ramsay MacDonald

The term has been used by left-wing commentators to criticise centrist views. Some traditional left-wingers regard the first Labour Prime Minister Ramsay MacDonald as a "champagne socialist" who betrayed the Labour movement. MacDonald's lavish lifestyle and his mingling with high society were supposed to have been corrupting influences that led to the end of the Labour Government in 1931 and the eventual formation of the National Government. More recently, the epithet has been levelled at supporters of the New Labour movement which brought Tony Blair to power in 1997.

In an article about Oscar Wilde's 1891 essay "The Soul of Man under Socialism", political commentator Will Self expressed the view that Wilde could be considered an early champagne socialist because of his aesthetic lifestyle and socialist leanings.

The writer and Labour supporter John Mortimer, when accused of being a champagne socialist, said that he preferred to be thought of as "more a Bollinger Bolshevik".

In the fourth series of the British television comedy Absolutely Fabulous, Saffron is offered a job with New Labour. While she is at pains to avoid being seen as a champagne socialist, her grandmother considers the family to be "Bolly Bolsheviks".

The label has also been applied to the Labour politician Geoffrey Robinson MP on account of his large personal fortune. Singer Charlotte Church has described herself as a "prosecco socialist", referring to the increasing popularity and lower price range of non-champagne sparkling wines such as prosecco and cava.

In the UK, the term is often used by critics to disparage people with a leftwing political view. This argument claims that the champagne socialist espouses leftist views while enjoying a luxurious lifestyle.

This usage of the term has been criticised by Caitlin Moran as a fallacious argument, because she claims it assumes that only those who are poor can express an opinion about social inequality. Russell Brand made a similar point that the "hypocrisy" accusation serves to shut down discussion of the problem of inequality.

== Australia and New Zealand ==
In Australia and New Zealand, the variant "Chardonnay socialist" was used, as Chardonnay was seen as a drink of affluent people. By the late 1990s, chardonnay had become more readily available and generally consumed in Australia; today it is the most dominant white wine variety produced in the country. As a result, the drink's association with elitism has faded.

Staunch Australian right-wingers also used the term to deride those who supported what they considered "middle-class welfare"—government funding for the arts, free tertiary education, and the Australian Broadcasting Corporation.

== France ==
In France, the term gauche caviar (lit. 'caviar left') has a broadly similar meaning and usage as champagne socialist. One description referred to it as "the free-thinking, authority-hating, individualistic, tolerant, socialist position… which shaded into a bohemian, existential, communitarian, fairly depressed" worldview espoused by people with money and good clothes.

The term was once prevalent in Parisian circles, applied deprecatingly to those who professed allegiance to the Socialist Party (PS), but who maintained a far from proletarian lifestyle that distinguished them from the working-class base of the PS. A more explicit reference identified this group as left-wingers who speak with great passion about the plight of the poor while eating caviar in their spectacular Parisian duplex apartment.

The label was also employed by detractors to describe François Mitterrand. This was further reinforced by the fact that several members of his administration were identified as part of the gauche caviar such as Jack Lang, who was the culture minister.

In early 2007, Ségolène Royal became identified with the gauche caviar when it was revealed that she had been avoiding paying taxes. The description damaged her campaign for the French presidency. Similarly French politician Bernard Kouchner and his wife Christine Ockrent have been labelled with the term. However, his appointment as Minister of Foreign Affairs was not hampered by the label. Other supposed members of this gauche caviar include Dominique Strauss-Kahn, the former IMF managing director, and his wife, the journalist Anne Sinclair, heiress to much of the fortune of her maternal grandfather, the art dealer Paul Rosenberg. It is said that around 2015, the gauche caviar also supported the Greek government of SYRIZA and PM Tsipras, "desperate for a new 'anti-imperialist hero' after Hugo Chavez's death".

The weekly news magazine, Le Nouvel Observateur, has been described as the "quasi-official organ of France's gauche caviar".

== United States ==
In 2017, Current Affairs ran a lighthearted article featuring a political cartoon of guests at a Marxist gathering dressed in fancy attire and sipping on champagne. The central argument was that conspicuous consumption was not inherently antithetical to leftist values so long as luxuries were shared equally. As the magazine put it, "When we say let them eat cake, we are serious: there must be cake, it must be good cake, and it must be had by all. The reason Marie Antoinette needed beheading was not that she wished cake on the poor, but that she never actually gave them any."

The term appears in Blind Alleys, a 1906 work of fiction by the American author George Cary Eggleston which distinguishes the "beer socialist" who "wants everybody to come down to his low standards of living" and the "champagne socialist" who "wants everybody to be equal on the higher plane that suits him, utterly ignoring the fact that there is not enough champagne, green turtle and truffles to go round".

In a 2022 Reason article, Jason Brennan and Christopher Freiman characterized Bernie Sanders, Elizabeth Warren, and political commentator Hasan Piker as so-called "champagne socialists." In the article, Brennan and Freiman chide these "socialist figureheads" to "open their wallets before they open their mouths" on the basis that each had supposedly donated little of their personal wealth to causes they support, but had instead called for increased taxes. In the case of Sanders and Piker, Brennan and Freiman criticize their supposedly excessive living arrangements, while Warren is reprehended for donating only a small portion of her net worth to causes she advocates for.

== Other related terms ==
The term is broadly similar to the American terms "limousine liberal", "Learjet liberal", or "Hollywood liberal", and to idioms in other languages such as the Spanish Izquierda caviar, the Portuguese esquerda caviar, the Indian "Khan Market liberal" (which represents a highly affluent shopping area of South Delhi that is popular among leftists), the French Gauche caviar, the Dutch Salonsocialist, the German Salonbolschewist, the Italian Radical chic, the Swedish Rödvinsvänster (lit. 'Red vine left'), and the Polish kawiorowa lewica (lit. 'caviar left'). In Turkey, Solperen (lit. 'Lefty') or Cihangir solcusu (lit. 'Cihangir leftist') is commonly used, since Cihangir is a high-income neighborhood of Beyoğlu, Istanbul, although şampanya sosyalisti ("champagne socialist") and salon sosyalisti ("salon socialist") are used as well. In Switzerland, Cüpli-Sozialisten (lit. 'Glass-of-Champagne Socialist') is used. Other related terms include "Tuscany faction", "Hampstead liberal", "Gucci socialist", "Gucci communist", "Neiman Marxist", "cashmere communist", and in Ireland, "smoked salmon socialist".

== See also ==
- Armchair revolutionary
- Baizuo (white left)
- Bobo (socio-economic group)
- Blanquism
- Class traitor
- Do-gooder derogation
- Festive left
- Gauche caviar
- Gutmensch
- Liberal elite
- Limousine liberal
- Luxury beliefs
- Radical chic
- Regressive left
- Tu quoque
