= Hype culture =

Trend of exaggerated expectations in consumer culture

The term hype culture refers to a cultural trend within contemporary consumer culture, that corresponds to the constant search of the last "big thing". This phenomenon circulates around the concept of expectation, more precisely it is characterized by an attitude of excessive and positive expectations that consumers attach to products, services or technological advancements which have yet to be released.

Hype is a term broadly used in common practice to describe over-exaggeration, distortion and unnecessary amplification of information associated with innovation; hype culture could then be translated in "culture of the exaggeration". Hype culture does not only affect the target of hype practices, which is the final consumer buying the product after release, it has consequences also in establishing how producers and the media behave when innovative products or services are concerned.

Hype culture is synonym with the desire for the last novelty. Novelty is considered as a central characteristic in contemporary consumer culture, especially to the dynamics of fashion in modernity as suggested by Georg Simmel. Hype culture may also be related to conspicuous consumption, a concept proposed by Thorstein Veblen. According to Veblen's theory, people consume conspicuously for two main reasons – the first one is to be recognized by their peers and the second one is to achieve a higher social status in society. Both elements reflect the culture and social or economic class in which the consumers reside.

== Consumers expectations ==
Hype culture is strictly related to the concept of expectation. In sociology, expectation is defined as an idea about the future which is created and diffused through social interaction. Hype for a product, service or upcoming technology is built both on individual expectation and collective (or shared) expectation. Individually, expectation is set starting from the possessed knowledge and familiarity with the product or service of interest, it then carries on through time under the form of a conflict between perceptual judgments (judgments made on new information) and previous experience (judgments made previously, related to prior information). A collective expectation instead, is formed by shared imaginaries: forms of social life and social order centred on the development of innovation. However, a shared expectation is not disconnected from individual expectations, it is constructed around the latter through social interaction and the media coverage.

Hype culture and collective expectations are consequential, the hype built around an innovation, especially when done from the early stages of development, establishes a bond with targeted consumers creating a shared expectation. Such expectations evolve as the innovation is under development forming "communities of promise", attracting social actors, journalists and opinion leaders that do not wish to be excluded from such interactions.

Hype is generated when the otherwise natural mechanism of expectations gets inflated. the inflation is induced both by advertising strategies (such as trailers, demos or sneak peeks) as well as media coverage on the targeted innovation.

== Fandom communities ==
The growing visibility and accessibility of fandom in the era of digital media challenges notions of fandom as exceptional and distinct from "normal audiences". The continuity of forms of fan productivity, which now have often migrated online over the past two decades, changed fan cultures dramatically. It enhanced their visibility and accessibility, so fans construct their fan objects out of a 'textual field of gravity' composed from different episodes, trailers, narratives across their experiences and expectations. People who identify as ordinary fans have a broad fan object, they use online platforms such as YouTube to watch trailers and reviews in an attempt to find new series that nevertheless corresponds with their expectations. Also, there is other side of this case which is called 'anti-fans' in fandom communities. Anti-fans may have been fans in the past but have been disappointed by the fan object. Behind dislike after all there are always expectations. When such expectations are not met anti-fans can be created.

== Hype cycles for products, services and new technologies ==
Inspired by the "hype level" and the "engineering or business maturity level" curves, Gartner established the hype cycle model in 1995. This model explains that companies are aware of the hype and expectations generated by upcoming products or technologies and build strategies to maximize their profits according to this expectation they created. Marketers use specific techniques to stimulate hype, like the Gartner's hype cycle, which describes the typical progression of an emerging technology, from user and media overenthusiasm through a period of disillusionment to an eventual understanding of the technology's relevance and role in a market or domain.

Five phases can be distinguished:

- Innovation trigger: when the first public announcement is made about the product. It starts the hype; the media begin to talk about it.
- Peak of inflated expectations: the media coverage and the discussions about the product boost the expectations.
- Trough of disillusionment: the hype created around the product doesn't meet the performance. Public discussions and media coverage are now creating a negative hype.
- Slope of enlightenment: the technology is improved; real performance is reached by the product.
- Plateau of productivity: now that the product has been improved, it is adopted by the public.

A relevant example of that cycle could be illustrated by the Apple company, which insists a lot on the marketing and design side, creating an international hype around their products and, moreover, their "concept" than on the real efficacy of the new products.

This hype cycle theorized by Gartner is nowadays criticized by some scholars. Other scholars want to improve it with mathematical model relations, so that the model could quantitatively operationalize their analyses.

== Hype in the media and entertainment industry ==
The idea of hype culture in entertainment industry is based on an explosive flow of information, carried out within a network, in which users express their own preferences or opinions about a product or a service. For this reason, the online word-of-mouth can have a decisive influence on the final consumer's choice. This is amplified thanks to online advertising, blogs or online reviews.

Hype can build big expectations on people, affecting consumers negatively in case the final product doesn't meet the expectations built before release. This mostly happens within the fandom communities created in social media platforms such as Facebook, Reddit etc.

The effects of hype in contemporary consumer culture can be considered a "double-edged sword", because consumer's expectations raised for the launch of a new product can be met, but if a communication or marketing strategy is not managed rightly, this can lead to a general disappointment with a consequent damage of image of the brand or the product itself. Several examples of this effect are present in the history of film and videogame industries.

In the contemporary western entertainment industry, the concept of pre-order is associated with the trend of hype culture. This tactic is used by marketers and retailers with the intention of creating an increasing expected value of the product that has yet to be launched. The possibility of purchasing a new product tends to generate in the consumer's mind the feeling of being part of an exclusive community.

A recent example for this concept is the case of Cyberpunk 2077, a game that had been building hype for nearly a decade. After launch, many disappointed customers demanded refunds from distributors that they overwhelmed Sony's customer service representatives and even briefly took down one of its corporate sites. In response, Sony and Microsoft said they would offer full refunds to anyone who purchased the videogame through their online stores. But it is also a tale that insiders said they saw coming for months, based on CD Projekt Red's history of game development and warning signs that Cyberpunk 2077 might not live up to its sky-high expectations. That being said, 3 years after the launch the game actually managed lived up to the hype and expectation.

Sometimes the hype is used deliberately. In the movies and TV series industry, companies often use various marketing techniques in trailers in order to build hype and attract more attention. In the 2014 Godzilla movie for example, producers added the actor Bryan Cranston, after his successful starring role in AMC series Breaking Bad, using his character Joe Brody in every trailer to build up hype. Despite that, in the released version of the movie, people were left disappointed realizing that his character dies in the first third of the film.

== See also ==
- Early adopter
- Expectation
- Fandom
- Hipster
- Hype (marketing)
- Hype cycle
- Luxury beliefs
- One-hit wonder
