= Boba liberal =

Pejorative term for Asians in the West

Boba liberal is a term mostly used within the Asian diaspora communities in the West, especially in the United States. It describes someone of East or Southeast Asian descent living in the West who has a shallow, surface-level liberal outlook. It is also occasionally used to describe conservatives who weaponize their East or Southeast Asian identity. The neologism emerged among the Asian American leftist community on Twitter who accused "boba liberals" of only holding their liberal beliefs to appear more white-adjacent by engaging in progressive social movements or viewpoints, while at the same time disregarding and trivializing issues concerning Asians.

Mary Chao, writing for The North Jersey Record, said that "Asians call peers boba liberals when they aspire to liberal whiteness." An article in The Yale Herald described it as a term "used to describe the ethnocentric politics of Asian Americans, usually of East Asian descent, who exclusively advocate for issues that benefit themselves, without acknowledging problematic dimensions of their own history and working to support other people of color." The feminist magazine Fem said that "the faces of boba liberalism are Asian Americans that are part of the middle and upper economic class. As a result, boba liberals disregard the negative effects of capitalism because they profit from it. For instance, boba liberals tend to focus on advocating for Asian representation in white spaces, or discussing whether or not wearing chopsticks in one's hair is culture appropriation. These topics are popular within boba liberal circles, all while dialogue regarding inequality, globalization, and racial injustice are purposely neglected."

UnHerd notes that conservative Asian Americans have used the term not to critique capitalism, but to "aim at a small but influential group of progressive Asian-American activists who are supposedly selling out other Asians, especially working-class Asians, in order to win brownie points from elite, generally white liberals." MRAsians have similarly used the term to attack Asian American feminists who supported the Black Lives Matter movement.

The Asian identity of boba liberals has often been accused of being shallow and superficial. Boba liberals are accused of using surface-level stereotypical Asian traits such as liking boba tea to bolster their Asian credentials.

Plan A Magazine, an Asian diaspora magazine, described the film Crazy Rich Asians and the sitcom Fresh Off the Boat as "boba liberal media", calling them the result of "a specific kind of atomized identity politics". Other media outlets have connected the Crazy Rich Asians film to boba liberalism.

== Controversy ==
The term "boba liberal" was coined in 2019 by Vietnamese American Twitter user Redmond (@diaspora_is_red) to analyze a form of Asian American liberalism through a Marxist lens. Redmond has criticized the misappropriation of their neologism by stripping away the Marxist framework by failing to discuss "socialism, communism, the capitalist system, imperialism, and the diaspora bourgeoisie" and conflating "boba liberalism" with the flawed concept of "East Asian privilege". In 2024, Redmond criticized misuse of the term by conservatives and liberals, and said "The term boba liberalism can go away for all I care. It's corny and stale".

=== United States ===
One commentator described boba liberals as supporting policies that primarily benefit upper-income Asian-Americans, and not necessarily the Asian-American community as a whole. Therefore, while the word "liberal" is used in the term, it is not mutually exclusive to one specific ideology, as it may also extend to conservative-aligned Asians in some areas, as they would often take advantage of the "model minority" label by defending such measures.

== See also ==
- Milk tea alliance
- Acting white
- Baizuo
- Chinilpa
- Crab mentality
- Inferiority complex
- Internalized oppression
- Internalized racism
- Hanjian
- Limousine liberal
- Makapili
- Model minority
- Sarong party girl
- Tall poppy syndrome
- Race traitor
- Uncle Tom
- Liberal elite
