= Luxury belief =

Beliefs held to convey social status

"Luxury belief" is a term coined by the American writer Rob K. Henderson to describe beliefs which "confer status on the upper class at very little cost, while often inflicting costs on the lower classes". Individuals holding luxury beliefs are described as privileged and disconnected from the experiences of working class, impoverished, or marginalized people. Such individuals are considered to hold political and social beliefs that signal their elite status; these beliefs are putatively for the benefit of the marginalized but have negative impacts on them.

What constitutes a luxury belief is contested, and the term in general is considered to be controversial. It is used predominantly by conservative political commentators to describe various left-wing and liberal views, portraying them as being predominantly held by the privileged, and out of touch with the working class that they claim to support.

== Origin ==
The term is a neologism coined by Rob K. Henderson in 2019. Henderson alleges that, due to wider availability of material signifiers of wealth, power, fame and affluent Americans and British use their beliefs as a way to display their social status. Other commentators have previously drawn equivalences between opinions and material possessions.

Henderson has cited the view of defunding police as a "classic luxury belief" along with his other examples of decriminalizing drugs, getting rid of the SAT, and rejecting marriage.

== Uses of the term ==
Doug Lemov and co-authors in 2023 described Henderson's concept of the luxury belief as "an idea that confers social status on people who hold it but injures others in its practical consequences". Matthew Goodwin, professor of political science at the University of Kent, further argued in 2023 that such beliefs are held by people "who no longer measure somebody's status or moral worth through money, estates, titles or education but through the new lens of ideas and beliefs."

Some have argued that the belief that marriage and the nuclear family are no better than alternative family arrangements is a luxury belief, since there is evidence that family instability (which is equated to non-nuclear families, according to at least some who argue in favor of the term) is associated with poorer outcomes for children. Holding such beliefs, according to proponents of the concept, is deemed fashionable for elites but the actual effects on those involved, such as children experiencing family instability, are harmful. Henderson notes that outcomes such as rates of incarceration, college degree attainment, and substance abuse are more strongly correlated with children not living with both biological parents than with poverty: poor outcomes are more likely for children without both parents, and especially for foster children, than for children in poverty but with both parents.

In October 2023, former British Home Secretary Suella Braverman claimed in a speech that support for illegal immigration, net zero, and habitual criminals are luxury beliefs.

The editorial board of The Times has criticised transgender activists as holding luxury beliefs.

== Research and criticism ==
A 2026 study using a signaling game found "no evidence that individuals signal using luxury beliefs", and found belief in supposed luxury beliefs were positively correlated with education level, but negatively correlated with income.

In January 2024, The New York Times published a piece by opinion writer Jessica Grose in which she expressed skepticism about the concept of luxury beliefs and their impact, despite them being commonly associated with elites. Her critique focused on an example where Henderson mentions a Yale classmate who denigrated monogamy and marriage despite coming from a stable two-parent family and intending to maintain those practices. Grose pointed out that although some argue that beliefs held by elite college students could have a significant influence because they disproportionately lead the country, she has yet to hear of any prominent political figure or corporate leader saying that marriage is irrelevant. Throughout the article, Grose highlights different confounding factors that could explain declining views of marriage. She concludes by stating:

It's easy to point the finger at elites, cherry-pick their statements and stir a moral panic about the decline in the marriage rate over time. It's harder to meaningfully expand the safety net so that fewer children live in poverty—which really should be the focus of all this—even if their parents don't get hitched".

Veronique de Rugy, senior research fellow at the Mercatus Center, has criticised the application of the concept predominantly to the left, arguing that several ideas espoused by the modern right have negative impacts on working class communities as well, citing tariffs on imported goods in the Trump administration as an example.

In a critical review of Henderson's memoir, author Pippa Bailey has criticized the concept as unevidenced and unsubstantiated.

== See also ==
- Baizuo
- Bobo (socio-economic group)
- Champagne socialist
- Conspicuous consumption
- Just-world hypothesis
- Limousine liberal
- Luxury goods
- Millennial socialism
- Radical chic
- Social justice warrior
- Status symbol
- Virtue signalling
