= Liberal elite =

Term for politically liberal people

Liberal elite, also referred to as the metropolitan elite or progressive elite, is a term used to describe politically liberal people whose education has traditionally opened the doors to affluence, wealth and power and who form a managerial elite. It is commonly invoked pejoratively, with the implication that the people who claim to support the interests of the working class are themselves members of the ruling classes and are therefore out of touch with the real needs of the people they say that they support and protect.

== Usage ==
=== Canada ===
Canadian news outlet CBC reported on an event for supporters of Doug Ford (the premier of Ontario). A supporter described elites as "Those that think they're better than me". Doug Ford also described elites as "people who look down on the average, common folk, thinking they're smarter and that they know better to tell us how to live our lives". Alex Marland of the Memorial University of Newfoundland commented on Justin Trudeau's popularity with "liberal elites in metropolitan cities" in an article published in the Canadian Foreign Policy Journal entitled "The brand image of Canadian Prime Minister Justin Trudeau in international context".

=== China ===
The term baizuo (Chinese: 白左) is used to refer to left-liberal ideas commonly associated with White people in the Western world. This term depicts them as unrealistic, out of touch, and loving virtue signalling. It has also been widely used in Taiwan; this term specifically refers to white people in the West who often have higher education levels, liberal views, unrealistic expectations of the real world, and obsession with standing up for minorities even though these minorities are not offended.

==== Hong Kong ====
The term called zo gaau (Chinese: 左膠; Jyutping: zo2 gaau1) is widely used for similar effect in Hong Kong, which literally means "left dumbass" or "leftard". This term began appearing in Hong Kong political discourse in the 2010s, first in traditional media outlets and quickly spreading to online communication. This term refers to those who advocate peace, equality and non-violence in an unrealistic way only to satisfy their moral superiority. Their ideas are too lofty and sometimes ignore the imperfections of the real world in pursuit of their unrealistic dream.

=== India ===
In India, the term 'liberal elite' is used to describe the English speaking, left-leaning establishment aligned to Nehruvian socialism who have formed much of the mainstream intelligentsia and the ruling political class of India since its independence in 1947. The Indian National Congress, often referred to as the 'Grand Old Party' of India, is a left-liberal party, which has dominated Indian politics for much of the country's independent history.

=== Malaysia ===
In Malaysia, the term Bangsar Bubble is used to describe affluent Malay youth, usually highly educated and high-income groups (mostly T20 with M40 factions), notably in the Bangsar area of the Klang Valley. The term was initially used by leftists to criticize liberals who lack class analysis, but soon that term was appropriated to also refer to Malays who have embraced the Western left's progressive thinking. The group is usually associated with advocating some Western progressive issues such as LGBT rights (a taboo topic in the country), human rights, secularism, and racial issues. In terms of social media, they often use Twitter instead of Facebook, the latter of which is dominated by conservatives. The group usually endorses the Pakatan Harapan coalition or the Malaysian United Democratic Alliance.

=== South Korea ===
"Gangnam Leftist" (Korean: 강남 좌파) refers to the highly educated and high-income class with left-liberal tendencies in South Korean politics and society. They are mainly composed of upper-class members of the 386 Generation. In South Korea, the term is used with the same meaning as "limousine liberal" (Korean: 리무진 리버럴). They are sometimes referred to as "Gangnam liberals", after the wealthy Gangnam region of Seoul, and are differentiated from South Korea's traditional socialist and social democratic factions centered on the labor movement.

Gangnam leftist is a political term in South Korea, but it is also often used to refer to liberal politicians in countries other than South Korea. For example, Emmanuel Macron and Joe Biden have been referred to as Gangnam leftists in South Korean media.

=== Philippines ===
The Tagalog term dilawan, which means 'yellow ones' in reference to the color of liberalism as an ideology and movement (cf., pulahan for 'Reds'), is used to describe a "discredited brand of transactional reform politics" en vogue since the 1986 People Power Revolution (EDSA I). EDSA I, also known as the Yellow Revolution, has been disdained by detractors as a "revolution of mere elites rather than a revolution of the whole people", and one which "ignor[ed] the existence of the toiling masses and peasants in agrarian Philippines". The term's usage originated in the 1980s as a pejorative for Liberal Party loyalists and politically aligned groups or individuals, often associated with the genteel English-speaking elite. It gained renewed currency during the 2016 Philippine presidential election among hardline supporters of Rodrigo Duterte. (Note: Duterte's own party, PDP–Laban, had nevertheless itself been at "the forefront of many of those [EDSA I] demonstrations carrying yellow flags with the word[] LABAN and faced water cannons, police batons and threats of arrests". Sara Duterte has argued that, despite claims to the contrary by high-ranking members of the Catholic Church hierarchy—in particular, Archbishop Sócrates Villegas—her father had indeed appreciated the significance of the 1986 revolution right from the beginning. Duterte Carpio recounted, "On the evening of Feb[ruary] 25, 1986, I was playing in dreamland when my father interrupted my slumber and told me to get dressed because we ha[d] to go downtown [to the metropolitan cathedral]," adding that, "While we were huddled in the car, he told us, 'Remember this night. Do not forget it.'") In the country's English-language political-economic discourse, liberal elite is the term employed.

More than a decade prior to Duterte's election, in January 2001, the EDSA II protests, which have been denounced by critics as unrepresentative and elitist, culminated in the resignation under pressure of then-president Joseph Estrada and the installation of Gloria Macapagal Arroyo as his successor. Arroyo, educated abroad and fluent in multiple colonial languages, was highly regarded in liberal elite circles in contrast to Estrada, a university dropout whose proficiency in English was wanting. Populist protests against Arroyo would erupt three months later in what came to be known as EDSA III.

Duterte, while fluent in English, has similarly run afoul of the liberal elite, which repeatedly draws attention not only to his questionable antics—deplored by no less than his daughter Sara—but also to his frequent use of gutter language. This aversion, in turn, to gutter language has been criticized as indicative of a socioeconomically privileged upbringing that renders one out of touch with general society. Such attitudes have been described as a desire on the part of the liberal elite to "demonize" detractors by portraying them as somehow morally or intellectually deficient, as well as incapable of critical thought.

Estrada has since come out as a supporter of Duterte, expressing concern that the latter, like himself, might be driven out of office by whom he had referred to years earlier as the "rich and perfumed". Others have echoed Estrada's depiction of those who had deposed him, notwithstanding Estrada's own membership in albeit another section of the broader Philippine elite, or have similarly denounced what has been described as the moralism and sham decency of the liberal elite. Ultimately, Duterte's rise to power has come to be seen as the "people's verdict" on both the failures of the liberal order and what has been felt as the glibness of its domestic champions.

=== United Kingdom ===
Reference to the concept of a liberal elite has become commonplace in British political discourse. Such liberals are socially, culturally and generally economically (laissez-faire) liberal. The term Champagne socialist is a pejorative comparable term.

The liberal elite is represented as being closely linked to influential high-status occupations such as academia, law, showbusiness, journalism, the civil service and politics. Preponderance within these professions has made the ascendant group generally more comfortable with the shift toward delegating political power to courts, NDPBs and other technocratic forms of governance.

According to the stereotype, North London, especially the prosperous districts of Islington and Hampstead, is the metropolitan home of the liberal elite. The phrase "North London metropolitan liberal elite" was used by the then Home Secretary Priti Patel. Hampstead Socialist and Hampstead liberal have been used, referring to the North London area of Hampstead, an area with a long liberal tradition. The term Islington set came to prominence due to the close connection that senior New Labour figures had with Islington and the surrounding areas.

The author David Goodhart has written how the UK, like many western societies, is unconsciously divided into two main social classes, which he terms 'Somewheres' and 'Anywheres', with the liberal elite and most of the professional–managerial class drawn from the latter. According to Goodhart, Anywheres make up 20-25% of the population, Somewheres at least 50% with rest of the rest (including many of migrant background) being 'Inbetweeners'.

The more educated Anywheres leave their families to attend a residential university and then relocate to prosperous areas of big cities, particularly London. Friendship groups formed with similar people at university, in their workplace and new districts replacing links to people in their original home areas.

These diverging experiences are reflected in different political interests and priorities. Anywheres are relaxed about change, particularly the economic and cultural impact of globalisation. They are individualists who value autonomy and self-realisation over stability, community and tradition. Their dominance of key parts of society mean that liberal elite Anywheres have been able to "over-rule" the wishes of the poorer majority.

Their mobility makes Anywheres less invested in local communities, environments and identities. They are also less comfortable with their national identity, especially English identity, but comfortable with distinct separate identities for minorities. Socially insulated from Somewheres, Anywheres can struggle to understand Somewhere viewpoints. Conversely, Somewhere's generally comprehend the views of Anywhere's, partly through exposure to the ascendant culture via the media. Anywhere's tend to greater social tolerance, but are less politically tolerant and sometimes snobbish.

An example of this social dichotomy came when Emily Thornberry, Labour Party MP for Islington South and Finsbury, resigned as a member of the Shadow Cabinet in 2014, during the Rochester and Strood by-election, after she tweeted a picture of a house draped with England flags and the tradesman's white van of the occupier, parked outside with the caption 'Image from Rochester', thought by many to be a snobby jibe. Simon Danczuk, the then-Labour MP for Rochdale, commented that Thornberry's tweet furthers the perception that the Labour Party "has been hijacked by the north London liberal elite".

=== United States ===
In the United States, the stereotypical lifestyle of the liberal elite is often referenced in popular culture. Columnist Dave Barry drew attention to these stereotypes when he commented, "Do we truly believe that ALL red-state residents are ignorant racist fascist knuckle-dragging NASCAR-obsessed cousin-marrying roadkill-eating tobacco-juice-dribbling gun-fondling religious fanatic rednecks; or that ALL blue-state residents are godless unpatriotic pierced-nose Volvo-driving France-loving left-wing communist latte-sucking tofu-chomping holistic-wacko neurotic vegan weenie perverts?"

A 2004 political advertisement from the right-wing organization Club for Growth attacked the Democratic presidential candidate Howard Dean by portraying him as part of the liberal elite: "Howard Dean should take his tax-hiking, government-expanding, latte-drinking, sushi-eating, Volvo-driving, New York Times–reading, body-piercing, Hollywood-loving, left-wing freak show back to Vermont, where it belongs."

Those Americans who equate intellectual pursuits and careers with elitism often point out American intellectuals, most of whom are upper-middle-class not upper-class, are primarily liberal. As of 2005, approximately 72% of professors identify themselves as liberals. At Ivy League universities, an even larger majority, 87% of professors identified themselves as liberals. People with postgraduate degrees are increasingly Democratic.

== See also ==
- Baizuo
- Blairite
- Bobo
- Bourgeois socialism
- Cancel culture
- Champagne socialist
- Chattering classes
- Clique du Plateau
- Corporate liberalism
- Gauche caviar
- Girlboss
- Intelligentsia
- Intersectionality
- Identity politics
- Labour aristocracy
- Left Coast
- Let them eat cake
- Limousine liberal
- Lumpenbourgeoisie
- Massachusetts liberal
- Neoliberalism
- New class
- New Democrats
- New Labour
- Professional–managerial class
- Radical chic
- Regressive left
- Safe space
- San Francisco values
- Slacktivism
- Social justice warrior
- Virtue signalling
- Woke
