= Status symbol =

Object that denotes one's social position

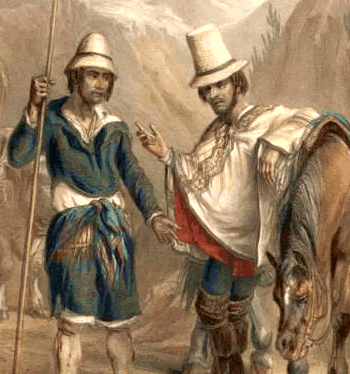
Social status is often associated with clothing and possessions. In this scene from Conquest of Chile, the foreman has a horse and high hat, while the inquilino (indebted laborer) does not.

A status symbol is a visible, external symbol of one's social position, an indicator of economic or social status. Many luxury goods are often considered status symbols. Status symbol is also a sociological term – as part of social and sociological symbolic interactionism – relating to how individuals and groups interact and interpret various cultural symbols.

== Etymology ==
The term "status symbol" was first written in English in 1955, but from 1959 with the publication of the bestseller "The Status Seekers" greater distribution. There, journalist Vance Packard describes the social strategy and behavior in the USA.

== By region and time ==
As people aspire to high status, they often seek also its symbols. As with other symbols, status symbols may change in value or meaning over time, and will differ among countries and cultural regions, based on their economy and technology.

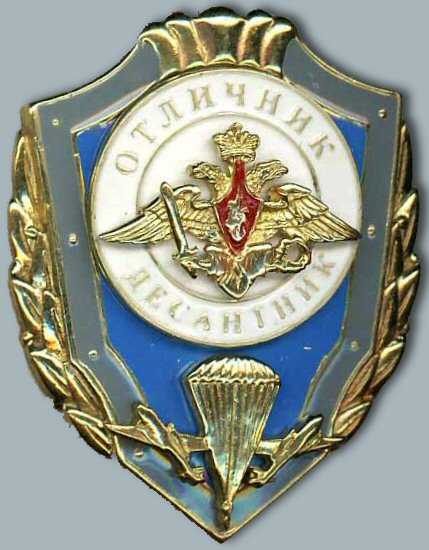
Military symbol of excellence

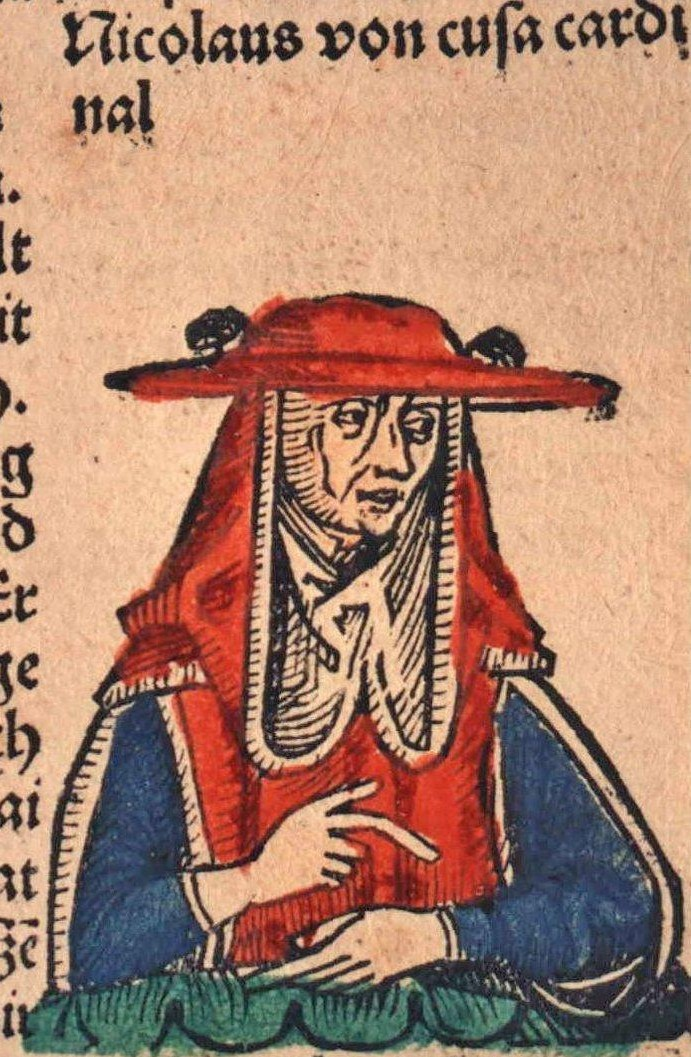
Galero hat, symbol of ecclesiastical status

For example, before the invention of the printing press, possession of a large collection of laboriously hand-copied books was a symbol of wealth and scholarship. In later centuries, books (and literacy) became more common, so a private library became less-rarefied as a status symbol, though a sizable collection still commands respect.

In some past cultures of East Asia, pearls and jade were major status symbols, reserved exclusively for royalty. Similar legal exclusions applied to the toga and its variants in ancient Rome, and to cotton in the Aztec Empire. Special colors, such as imperial yellow (in China) or royal purple (in ancient Rome) were reserved for royalty, with severe penalties for unauthorized display. Another common status symbol of the European medieval past was heraldry, a display of one's family name and history.

== Societal recognition ==
Status symbols also indicate the cultural values of a society or a subculture. For example, in a commercial society, having money or wealth and things that can be bought by wealth, such as cars, houses, or fine clothing, are considered status symbols. Where warriors are respected, a scar can represent honor or courage. Among intellectuals being able to think in an intelligent and educated way is an important status symbol regardless of material possessions. In academic circles, a long list of publications and a securely tenured position at a prestigious university or research institute are a mark of high status. It has been speculated that the earliest foods to be domesticated were luxury feast foods used to cement one's place as a "rich person".

A uniform symbolizes membership in an organization, and may display additional insignia of rank, specialty, tenure and other details of the wearer's status within the organization. A state may confer decorations, medals or badges that can show that the wearer has heroic or official status. Elaborate color-coded academic regalia is often worn during commencement ceremonies, indicating academic rank and specialty.

In many cultures around the world, diverse visual markers of marital status are widely used. Coming of age rituals and other rites of passage may involve granting and display of symbols of a new status. Dress codes may specify who ought to wear particular kinds or styles of clothing, and when and where specific items of clothing are displayed.

== Body modifications ==
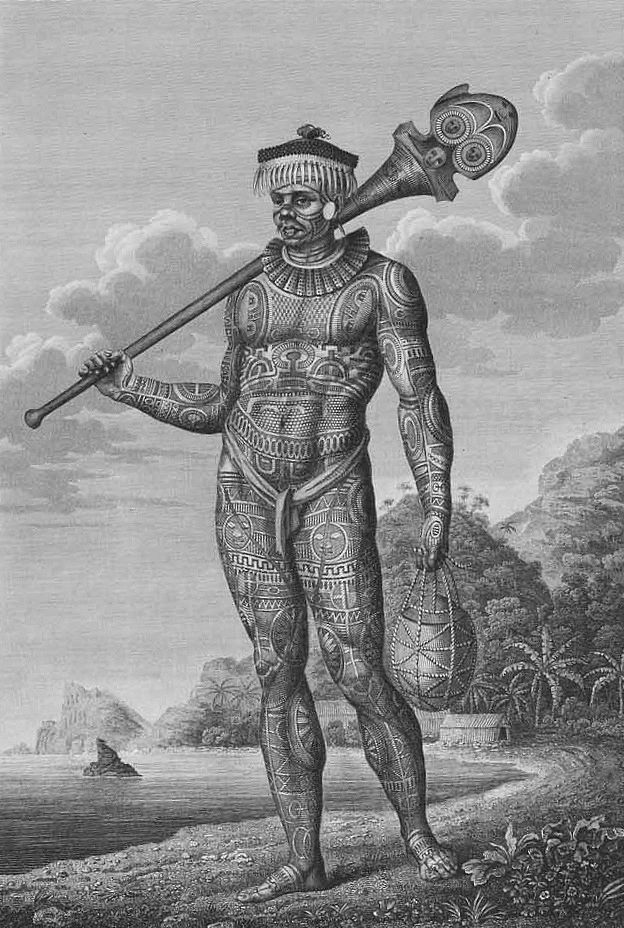
Warrior tattoos

The condition and appearance of one's body can be a status symbol. In times past, when most workers did physical labor outdoors under the sun and often had little food, being pale and fat was a status symbol, indicating wealth and prosperity (through having more than enough food and not having to do manual labor). Now that workers usually do less-physical work indoors and find little time for exercise, being tanned and thin is often a status symbol in modern cultures.

Ancient Central American Maya cultures artificially induced crosseyedness and flattened the foreheads of high-born infants as a permanent, lifetime sign of noble status. The Mayans also filed their teeth to sharp points to look fierce, or inset precious stones into their teeth as decoration.

== Material possessions ==
These residences, in addition to providing a high level of privacy and security, serve as symbols of power and prestige, often linked to noble dynasties, prominent entrepreneurs, financial leaders, and influential figures on the international stage. The value of such properties is not determined by their strategic location or architectural features but, more importantly, by their function as instruments of social representation and status assertion, since access to them is often restricted even for those with immense wealth.

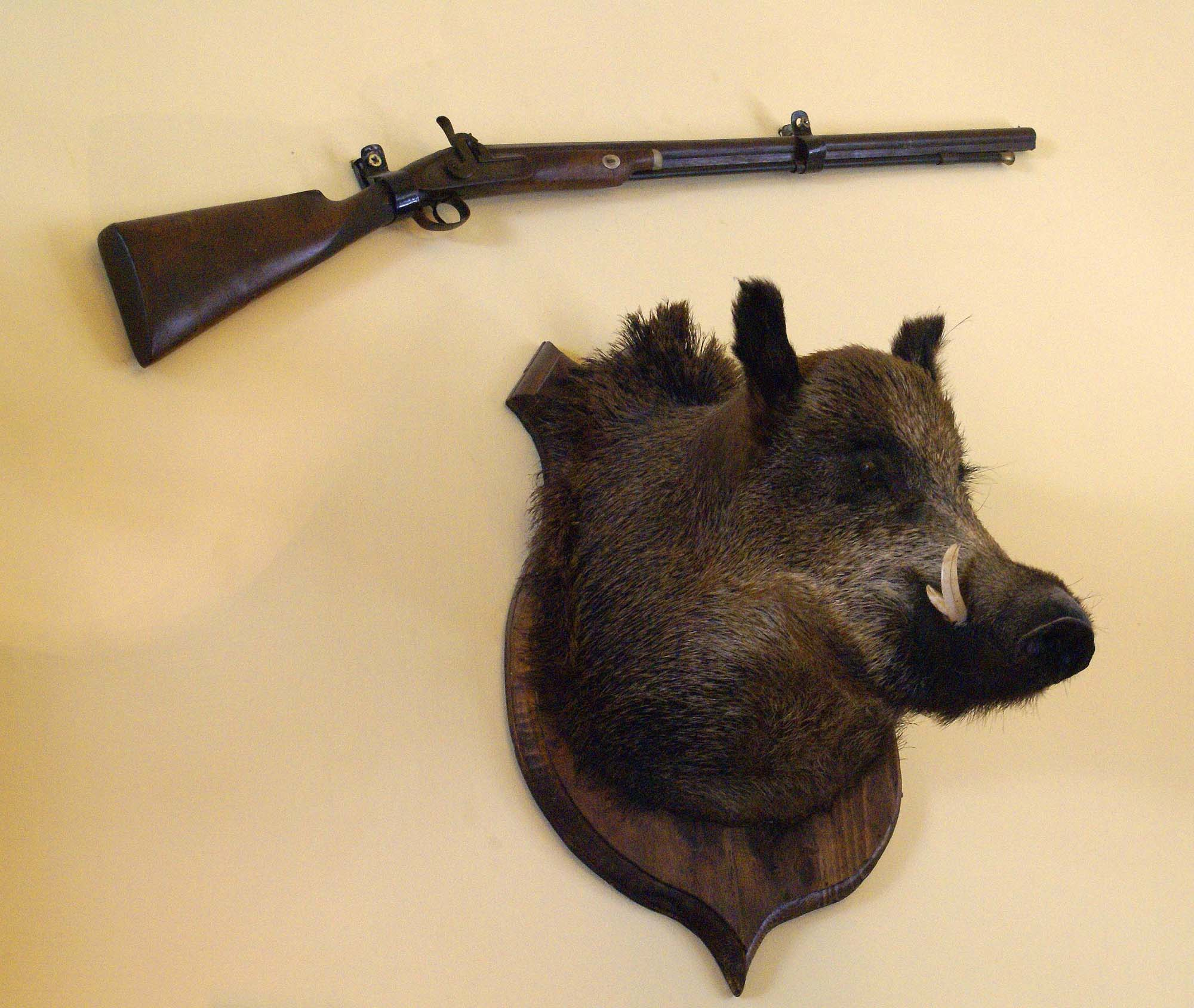
Hunting trophy of an aristocrat

Luxury goods are often perceived as status symbols. Examples may include a mansion or penthouse apartment, a "trophy wife", haute couture fashionable clothes, jewellery, or a luxury vehicle. A sizeable collection of high-priced artworks or antiques may be displayed, sometimes in multiple seasonally occupied residences located around the world. Privately owned aircraft and luxury yachts are movable status symbols that can be taken from one glamorous location to another; the "jet set" refers to wealthy individuals who travel by private jet and who frequent fashionable resorts.

In recent years, products such as Louis Vuitton bags, iPhones, luxury cars, and high-end Swiss watches have increasingly functioned as status symbols, representing wealth, success, and social prestige. Louis Vuitton’s recognizable monogram communicates exclusivity and fashion awareness, while iPhones can signal modernity, technological sophistication, and belonging to a particular social group. Luxury cars, such as Mercedes-Benz, BMW, and Porsche, can communicate success and achievement, while high-end watches from brands like Rolex or Patek Philippe are often seen as symbols of wealth, taste, and prestige. Social media has also made these products even more visible, as people frequently share their purchases and lifestyles online. However, in recent years, status has also started to shift toward less obvious forms of wealth, such as travel, experiences, free time, and personal well-being.

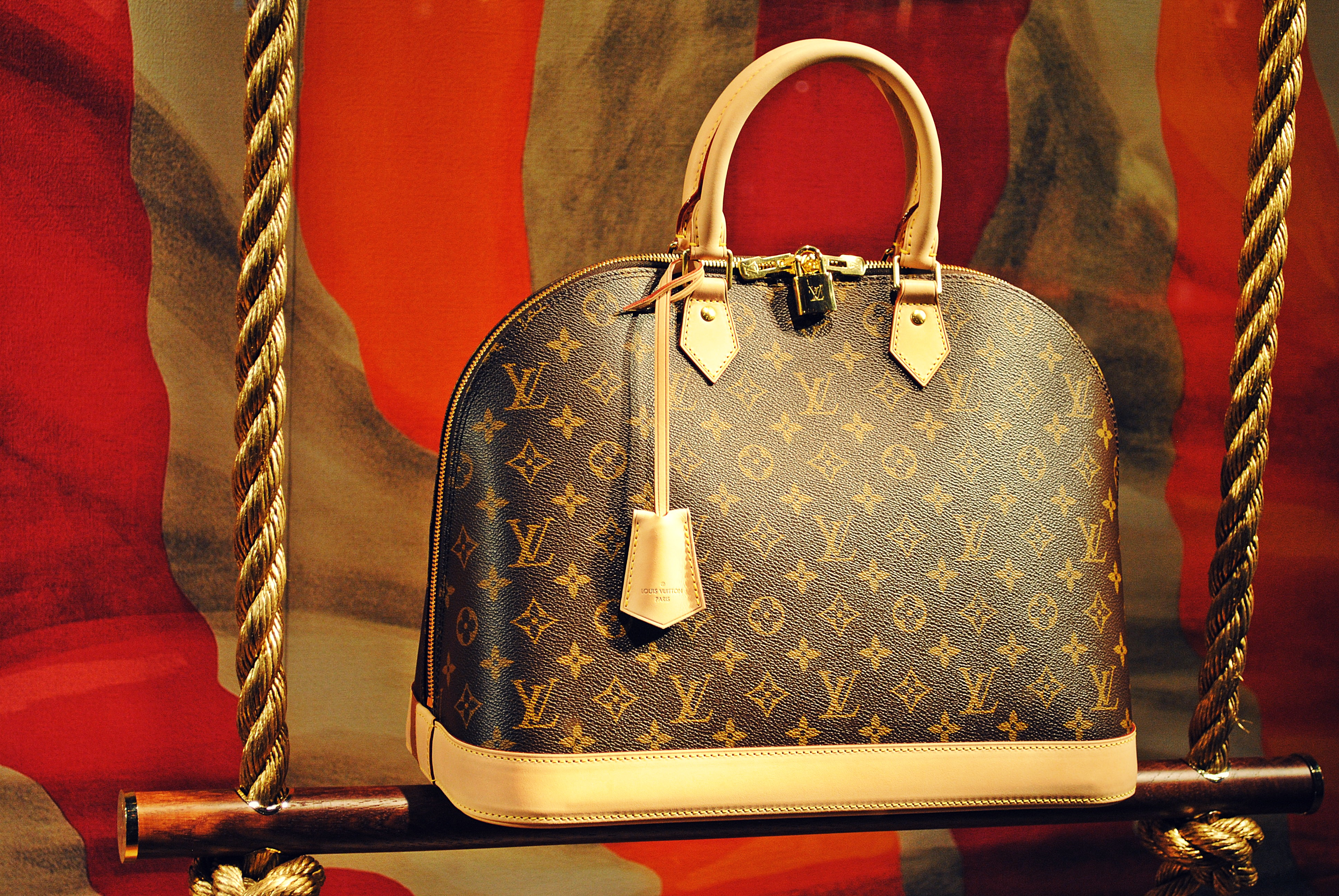
Status symbols in recent years have often been associated with luxury goods and high-end consumer products. Common examples include a pair of iPhone devices, Louis Vuitton leather goods, a Rolex watch, and a luxury vehicle, such as a Rolls-Royce.

Status symbols are also used by persons of much more modest means. In the Soviet Union before the fall of the Berlin Wall, possession of American-style blue jeans or rock music recordings (even pirated or bootlegged copies) was an important status symbol among rebellious teenagers. In the 1990s, foreign cigarettes in China, where a pack of Marlboro could cost one day's salary for some workers, were seen as a status symbol. Mobile phone usage had been considered a status symbol (for example in Turkey in the early 1990s), but is less distinctive today, because of the spread of inexpensive mobile phones. Nonetheless, Apple products such as iPhone are common status symbols among modern teenagers.

A common type of modern status symbol is a prestigious luxury branded item, whether apparel or other type of a good. The brand name or logo is often prominently displayed, or featured as a graphic design element of decoration. Certain brands are so highly valued that cheap counterfeit goods or knock-off copies are purchased and displayed by those who do not want to, or are unable to, pay for the genuine item.

== See also ==
- Badge of shame
- Belongingness
- Conspicuous consumption
- Dress code
- Fashion accessory
- Identity performance
- Luxury belief
- Narcissistic supply
- Occupational prestige
- Positional good
- Relative deprivation
- Social stratification
- Sumptuary law
- Veblen good
