= Baizuo =

Derogatory Chinese neologism

Baizuo (Chinese: 白左; pinyin: báizuǒ; lit. 'white left') is a derogatory Chinese neologism used to refer to Western liberals and leftists, especially in relation to refugee issues and social problems. The term originated in the 2010s and has since come into more frequent use by Chinese nationalists critical of Western liberal and leftist ideologies for their alleged over-tolerance to immigration issues and by netizens who agreed with Donald Trump's anti-immigration policies. The term has also been used in English by American conservatives.

== Etymology ==
The word is made up of two Chinese morphemes, bai (Chinese: 白; pinyin: bái, "white") and zuo (Chinese: 左; pinyin: zuǒ, "left"). Although the word is most commonly used in its literal sense, it can also be used to mean idiotic or morally naive liberals regardless of ethnicity. It is believed that the word came from China's netizens. An article from the Southern Metropolis Daily goes further, referring to the term as originating from a 2010 article, "The Fake Morality of the Western 'White Left' and the Chinese 'Patriotic Scientists'", (Note: Simplified Chinese: 西方“白左”和中国“爱国科学家”的伪道德; traditional Chinese: 西方「白左」和中國「愛國科學家」的偽道德; pinyin: Xīfāng báizuǒ hé zhōngguó àiguó kēxuéjiā de wěidàodé.) written by Li Shuo, a Renren Network user. He satirizes the foreign left-wing youths who came to China before 1949 to help the Chinese Communist Revolution while being sympathetic to communism. (Note: According to Li Shuo's original article, he refers to Erwin Engst and Joan Hinton.: Li 2010: "古人云"来而不往非礼也"，天朝不但在物流上被美帝非礼，一船船的货真价实的商品运到美国去，换来的却是堆积如山的冥币（见《人民币？人冥币！》），人流上也被美帝非礼，一飞机一飞机货真价实的的知识分子运到美国去，换回来的是零星的"爱国科学家"以及更为罕见的"白左"，前者以钱学森、钱伟长、萧光琰为代表，后者以阳早、寒春夫妇为代表。" [As the old saying goes, "It is impolite not to reciprocate," but not only is the Celestial Empire being treated impolitely by the American Empire in terms of logistics – a boatload of genuine goods shipped to the United States, in exchange for a mountain of hell money (see "People's Currency? People's Hellish Currency!") – but also being treated impolitely in terms of people – a plane of genuine intellectuals were shipped to the United States in exchange for a smattering of "patriotic scientists" and the even rarer "white left", the former is represented by Qian Xuesen, Qian Weichang and Xiao Guangdian, and the latter by Erwin Engst and Joan Hinton.]) On the other hand, Chenchen Zhang believes the term only dates back to about 2015 when, with the refugee crisis in Europe and the rise of right-wing populism in the United States, the term became popular as Chinese netizens criticized the leftist and liberal views in the West. Zhang summarizes the commonality of hundreds of relevant responses on Zhihu, which accuses baizuo of being hypocritical humanitarians who advocate for peace and equality only to "satisfy their own feeling of moral superiority"; of caring only about topics such as immigration, minorities, and LGBT rights; of tolerating the "regressive values" of Islam for the sake of multiculturalism; of supporting the welfare state at the expense of tolerating lazy people; and of being "ignorant and arrogant westerners" who "pity the rest of the world and think they are saviours".

The initial popularity of the term has been attributed by several surveys to overseas Chinese communities, often high-technology practitioners or small business owners. Yinghong Cheng, a professor of World History at Delaware State University, claims the term's spread to be a result of their lack of education in humanitarian equality, and, because of their life experience of hard work in the West, that they are uncomfortable and even hostile to new concepts and doctrines in religion, gender, sexuality and family. Three meanings of the term have been specified through analysis: the term represents a perceived racial distinction in the global racial hierarchy by the Chinese people; through the term, the racial other has been identified as a racial traitor; the term refers to a group of people who are perceived to have a destructive influence on developed civilizations, including China, and Chinese nationalists must take the side of the global rightists against the damage leftists allegedly cause to civilization. It is also related to another term, shèngmǔ (simplified Chinese: 圣母; traditional Chinese: 聖母; lit. 'Holy Mother'), a reference to those whose political opinions are perceived as being sympathetic towards immigration. These words have analogies with English words like libtard, but they also partially encompass the Chinese view of classical Western culture.

== Usage ==
=== 2015 European migrant crisis ===
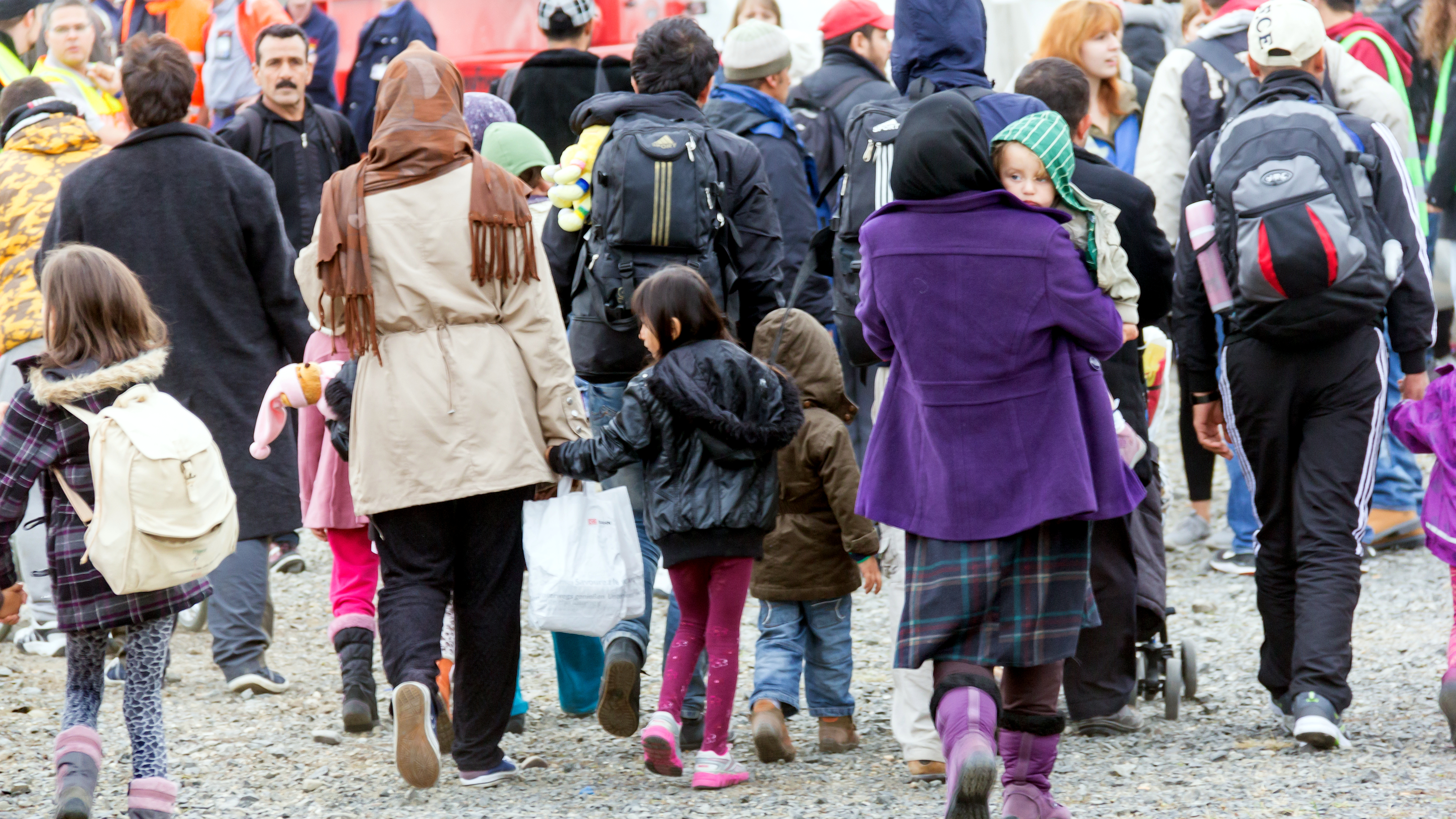
The European migrant crisis stirred up intense debate among Chinese internet users, as well as increased use of baizuo.

The term comes up often under topics related to the 2015 immigration crisis in Europe and is often used to accuse European politicians of being overly tolerant in their treatment of refugees. While some praised the decision of Austria and Germany to open their borders to refugees to welcome those stranded in Hungary after Alan Kurdi's death, just as many accused it of leading to chaos, with the subsequent New Year's Eve sexual assault considered a solid piece of evidence that Chinese internet users blamed on the "white left" ideology of Europe and compared to the parable of The Farmer and the Viper. In mid-2016, an Amnesty International questionnaire showed that 94 percent of Chinese were willing to accept refugees, yet already in mid-2015, a Weibo blogger observed that it was "politically correct" to mock Merkel or other "leftist" politicians on Weibo because of their moderate platforms for refugees. Amnesty International's paper elicited a fierce reaction, and an ensuing Global Times poll showed that 90.3 percent of Internet users did not want to accept refugees, leading Global Times to call Amnesty International's survey "peculiar" and an attempt to "incite antagonism against the government among the public".

World Refugee Day on 20 June 2017 experienced another similar event when Yao Chen, China's first UNHCR Goodwill Ambassador, held a charity event in Beijing at which the film Welcome to Refugeestan was screened, and later that day, the UN Human Rights Office celebrated the event by making a post on Weibo, and official Chinese media outlets posted in support. However, a large number of people online voiced their opposition and believed that the initiative was a way to pressure China to accept refugees, and some rumors claimed that the construction of refugee camps had already begun in some areas of China. On 22 June, the Guangdong Communist Youth League created a similar questionnaire asking citizens if they were willing to support the Chinese government's acceptance of Middle Eastern refugees and this time, only about 0.5% said they did. On 23 June, Chinese Foreign Minister Wang Yi, in a meeting with the Lebanese Foreign Minister Gebran Bassil, stressed that refugees are not migrants and that they will all eventually return to their home countries. On 26 June, Yao apologized and expressed her agreement with Wang's view.

Several nationalist narratives—some of them identical to the right-wing populism of the West—have been observed alongside the term online, such as the belief that the introduction of immigrants will lead to the replacement of majority ethnic groups, anti-elitism, opposition to mainstream media sentiment, identitarianism, national rejuvenation, nativism, social Darwinism and pragmatism, with the term being used as a key rhetorical device to chain these ideas together. Chinese online communities have adopted the narrative that intervention from the United States and the West instigated the Syrian civil war and caused the refugee crisis and therefore accuse Western countries of hypocrisy on the refugee issue. In addition, due to the one-child policy implemented in China, the introduction of immigrants is more likely to be seen as an act, at least in the imagination, of displacing the majority ethnic groups.

=== Donald Trump 2016 presidential campaign ===
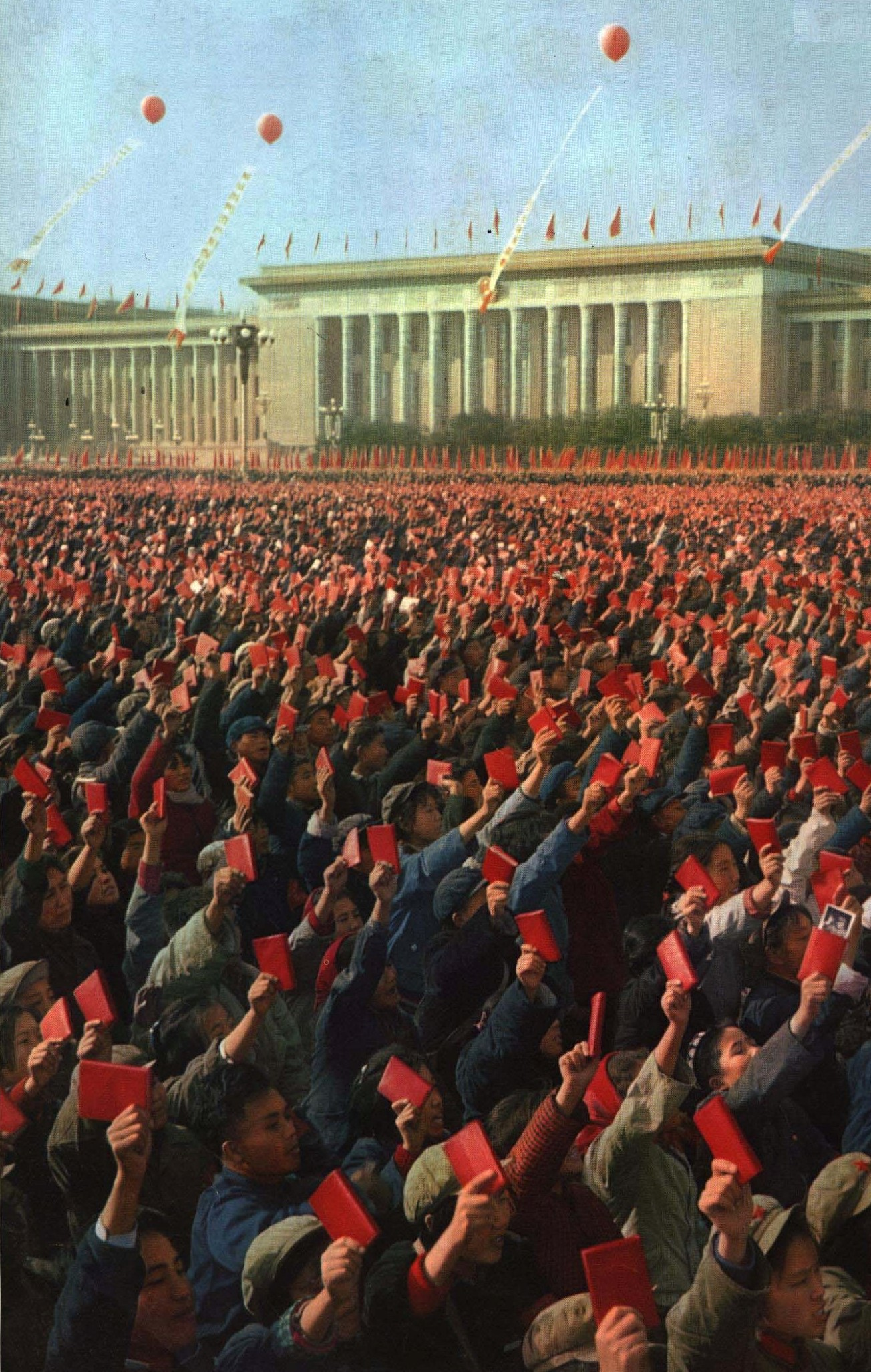
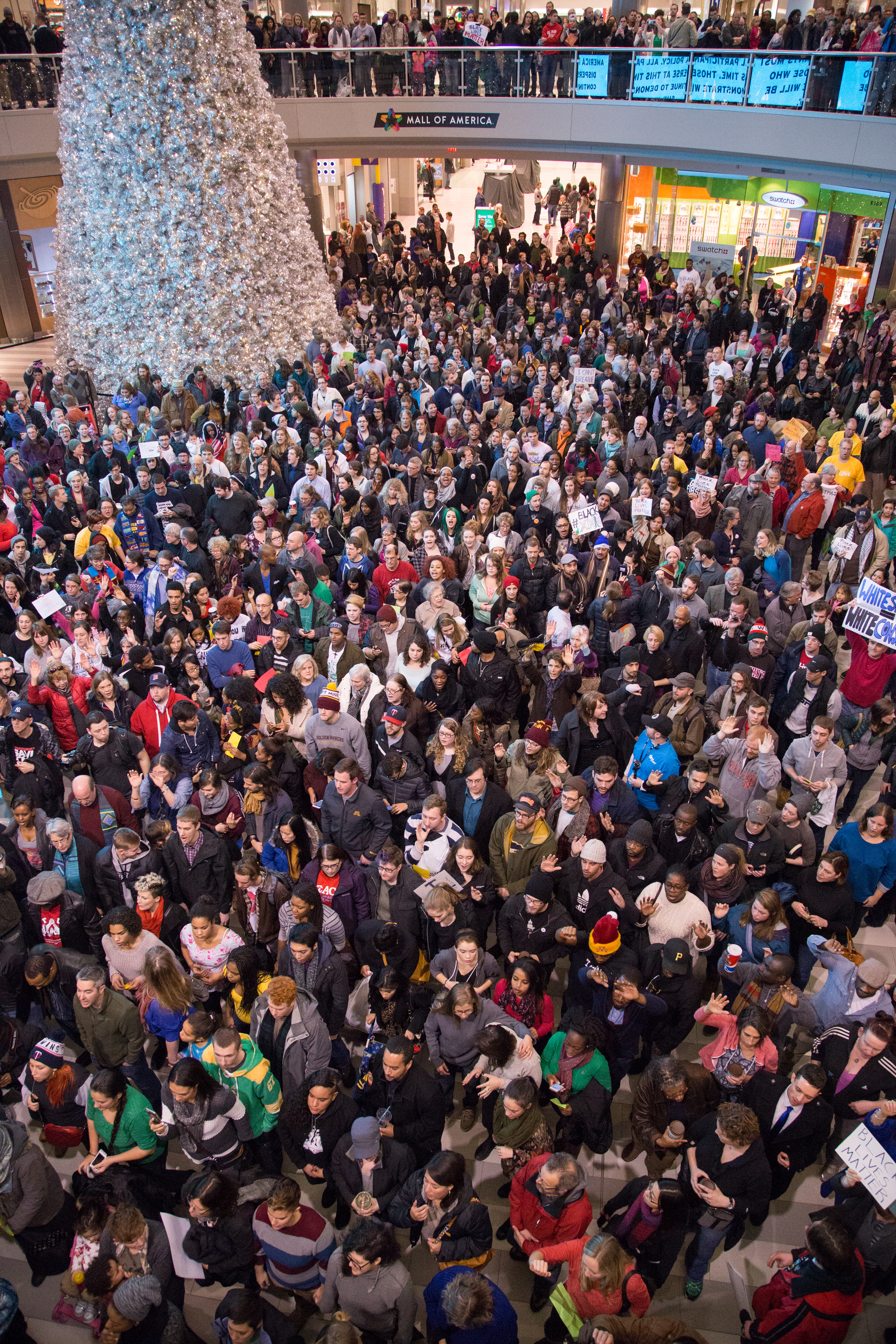
The Maoist agenda is an important part among debates of leftist agendas in China. Liberal intellectuals who are critical of baizuo, for example, contend that there are similarities between the Red Guards (left) and Black Lives Matter activists (right).

Donald Trump announced his candidacy for the United States presidency in 2015. His right-wing electoral strategy has appealed not only to Chinese nationalists but also to many Chinese liberals. For nationalists, Trump's populist, anti-immigrant campaign has appealed to them, though that appeal is also noted as more of an opposition to American liberalism or even liberal democracy itself. Over time, the term has come to be used to describe people who uphold similar policies, such as Barack Obama, rather than focusing on their race. For Chinese liberals, or at least some of them, Trump's toughness and conservatism toward China have appealed to them, and they want to use similar conservative ideas to promote a liberal democratic system in China. Both liberals who support Trump and those who criticize him invoke cases like the Cultural Revolution or the Great Leap Forward as an overall critique of leftists and believe that the American left will similarly lead to these happening in the United States. The former equate the removal of Confederate memorials with the destruction of the Four Olds, Black Lives Matter activists with the Red Guards, and MeToo with the big character poster or struggle session. They draw the conclusion that the "white left" is wreaking devastation on America through these analogies. The latter, though, connect Trump's populism to Maoism.

Similar to the case during the 2015 European migrant crisis, the support for American right-wing populism has also been seen as a result of Chinese pragmatism. For nationalists, the use of the term is accompanied by expressions of China's rise and sense of competition. For liberal intellectuals, the criticism of the "white left" and the praise of Trump also represent their non-nationalist sentiment and pro-market sentiment.

=== Use by American conservatives ===
In fact, they have a name for our self-hating professional class. They call them baizuo. The rough translation from Mandarin is 'white liberal', and it is definitely not a compliment.

— Tucker Carlson, March 20, 2020

Since the popularity of the term in China, conservatives in the United States, especially nationalist conservatives, have also begun to use the term. Prominent conservatives Tucker Carlson and Rod Dreher have used the term to criticize American leftist and liberal ideas. In March 2020, Carlson introduced the term on his television show, while Dreher used "baizuocracy" to describe "white leftist government". The use of the term has been described as embodying a shift in attitudes among a section of the American right that now admires China and believes it will prevail over the liberal-leaning United States. There are claims that the term is motivated by Chinese debates about nationalism and New Confucianism, not conservatism in the American sense.

=== Toleration by government ===
Despite its possible racist elements, the use of this term does not appear to be censored by the Chinese government, possibly because it contributes to the development of a sense of cyber-nationalism on the Chinese internet. Zhang Chenchen believes that this laissez-faire is due to the government's tolerance and even encouragement of discussions that portray the West as divided and in decline as a result of democratic politics. She states this means that the government wants to see social media users portray Western politicians as hypocritical and self-serving on human rights issues.

== See also ==
- Boba liberal
- Champagne socialist
- Cultural Marxism conspiracy theory
- The Decline of the West
- Gauche caviar
- Han chauvinism
- Liberal elite
- Limousine liberal
- Luxury belief
- New Left (Chinese New Left)
- Regressive left
- Social justice warrior
- Westsplaining
- White savior
- Woke
- Xenophobia
