= MRAsians =

Asian-American subculture

The Asian men's rights movement, often shortened as MRAsians, is an anti-feminist subculture among Asian-American men. The movement has been linked to harassment of Asian-American women, feminists, and public figures, and associated communities are characterized by misogyny, anti-blackness, and Asian-supremacist views.

== Background ==
The MRAsian movement emerged as a response to the historical emasculation of Asian-American men produced by discriminatory laws and stereotypes found in media depictions. According to researcher Angela Liu, the "hypermasculine ethnonationalism" found in the works of Asian-American author Frank Chin has had an important influence on MRAsian ideology. Some writers have also compared supporters of the movement to the incelosphere, referring to them as "ricecels".

== Ideology and views ==
=== Masculinity ===
According to Liu, MRAsians desire visibility for Asian-American men and seek to be perceived as ultramasculine. They believe that emasculating stereotypes of Asian-American men are linked to disenfranchisement from political power and difficulties in heterosexual dating for Asian-American men. They argue that as a result of this disempowerment, Asian-American men do not enjoy male privilege.

=== Asian-American women ===
According to Laura Sirikul, the movement focuses on controlling Asian-American women and criticizing interracial relationships. Liu argues that MRAsians believe that societal stereotypes of Asian-American women as sexually desirable grant them political power and an ability to gain societal privilege through white adjacency. Sirikul argues that many MRAsians "weaponise statistics" against Asian women.

MRAsians see Asian-American women who date white men as being complicit in white supremacy or engaging in "white worshipping". Women that MRAsians deem to be undermining Asian-American interests are labelled as "Lu" or "Aunt Lu", by analogy to Uncle Tom.

=== Social justice movements ===
Liu notes that MRAsians view Asian-American feminists' criticism of misogyny within Asian communities as malicious. "Progressive Asian activists" and "boba liberals" are viewed unfavorably. In the context of the MRAsian community, the term "boba liberal", originally a leftist term, has evolved to mean those who are seen to have betrayed Asian interests.

MRAsians believe that mainstream social justice advocates in the United States have ignored Asians in favor of Black people and have failed to respond adequately to violence against Asian Americans committed by Black people. They have harassed critics of anti-blackness and cultural appropriation within the Asian American community.

== Online communities ==
The MRAsian community has previously been reported to have been active on the website Reddit, with the subreddit r/aznidentity reported to have contained many such members. According to Chinese-American writer Celeste Ng, several Asian American woman public figures have received harassment after being criticized on the subreddit. It has also been reported that subreddit encouraged the use of fake Twitter accounts with an attractive looking Asian man as a profile picture to amplify their viewpoints.

== Harassment ==
Members of the MRAsian community have harassed Asian Americans that they deem to be race traitors or to have harmed the interests of Asian-American men.

MRAsians have criticized and harassed various Asian American public figures, including author Celeste Ng and actors Constance Wu and Ken Jeong; the former two for dating white men and the latter for participating in what they perceive to be negative on-screen portrayals of Asian Americans. Harassment from MRAsians has caused some Asian American public figures to become reluctant to engage in public discourse on sensitive issues.

One Yale student received online harassment and threats from MRAsians after she criticized anti-Black racism in the Asian American community.

== Criticism ==
Researcher Angela Liu indicates that MRAsians' opposition to feminism is an "incoherent solution" to Asian American men's issues. Liu notes that much of the academic research into discrimination against Asian American men is rooted in feminism, and that the cultural emasculation of Asian American men is a result of White supremacy and not feminism. She also argues that MRAsians who see Asian women as privileged confuse sexual desirability and societal privilege, noting that non-white groups stereotyped as desirable are subjugated and fetishized, rather than privileged.

== Bibliography ==
- Liu, Angela (2021). "MRAsians: A Convergence between Asian American Hypermasculine Ethnonationalism and the Manosphere". Journal of Asian American Studies. 24 (1): 93–112. doi:10.1353/jaas.2021.0012. ISSN 1096-8598.
- Mak, Aaron (2021-09-15). ""Men's Rights Asians" Think This Is Their Moment". Slate. ISSN 1091-2339. Archived from the original on September 15, 2021.
- Ng, Celeste (2018-10-12). "When Asian Women Are Harassed for Marrying Non-Asian Men". The Cut. Archived from the original on October 12, 2018.
- Sharkey, Grace (2 January 2022). "Failure to thrive: incels, boys and feminism". Continuum. 36 (1): 37–51. doi:10.1080/10304312.2021.1958160. ISSN 1030-4312.
- Sirikul, Laura (2022-01-28). "Opinion | Why the Men's Rights Asians subculture is so toxic — and dangerous". NBC News.
- Zhang, Zoe (2022-02-03). "MRAsians and ricecels are harming women". The Michigan Daily.
- Power, Platforms, & Politics: Asian Americans & Disinformation 2022 Landscape Report (PDF) (Report). August 2022. Archived (PDF) from the original on October 27, 2022.
