= Rob K. Henderson =

American political commentator

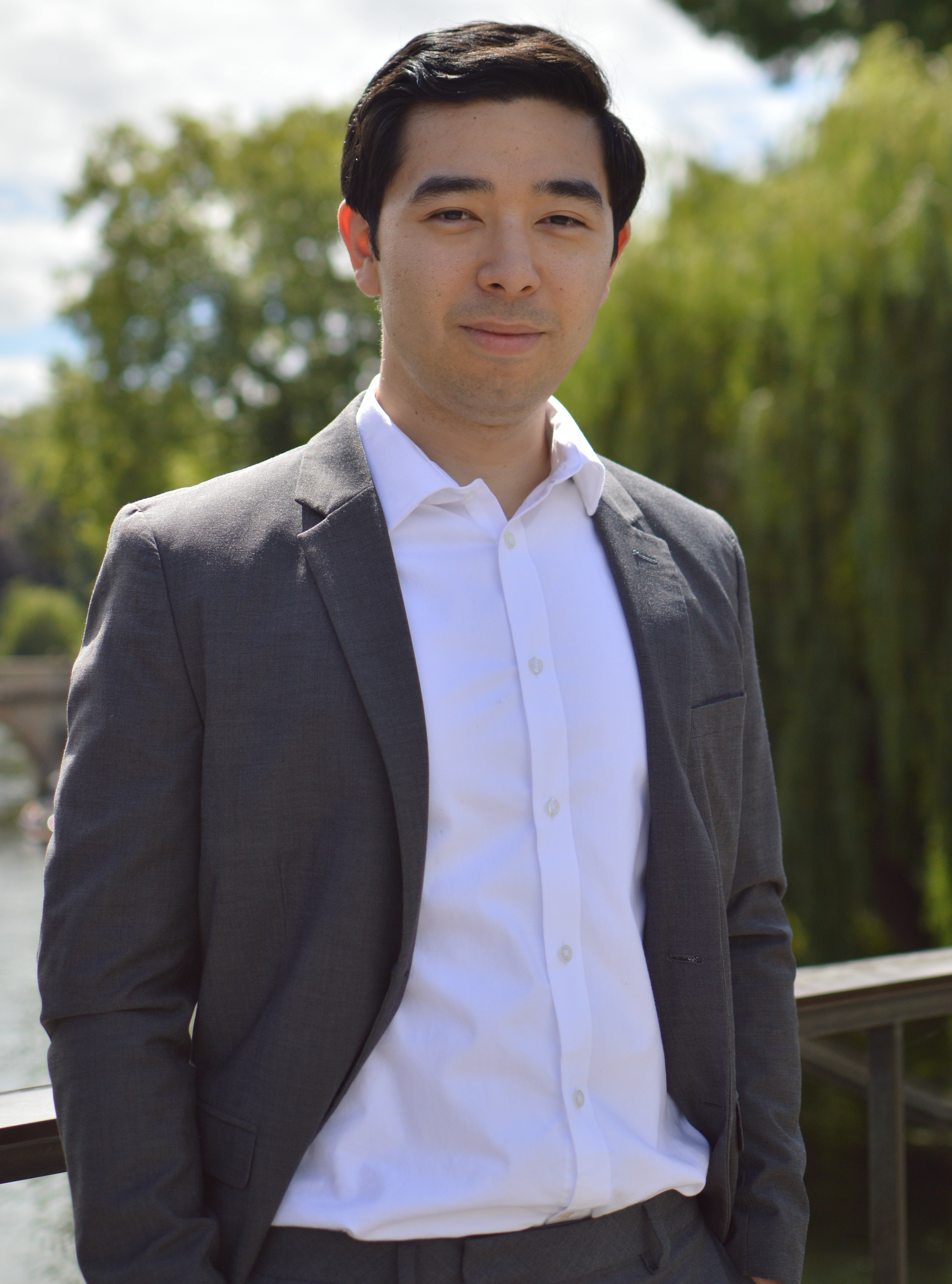
- Henderson in 2021
- Born: Robert Kim Henderson; 1990 (age 35–36); Los Angeles, California, U.S.
- Education: Yale University (BS); University of Cambridge (PhD)
- Occupation: Political commentator
- Writing career
- Subjects: Politics; Psychology
- Notable work: Troubled: A Memoir of Foster Care, Family, and Social Class
- Military career
- Branch: United States Air Force
- Service years: 2007–2015
- Website: www.robkhenderson.com

Robert Kim Henderson (born 1990) is an American writer and political commentator known for coining the term luxury beliefs. His memoir, Troubled: A Memoir of Foster Care, Family, and Social Class, was published in 2024 by Simon & Schuster's Gallery Books.

== Early life and education ==
Henderson's mother was born in Seoul, South Korea. His father, who he did not grow up with, was of Mexican and Spanish descent. His mother, who suffered from substance abuse, was unable to care for him, leading to him being sent to foster care at the age of three. Henderson was raised in various foster homes around the state of California. He was adopted by a working class family at the age of 7 in the town of Red Bluff, California, and his parents later divorced. He served in the United States Air Force after high school. Following his enlistment, Henderson attended Yale University with the support of the G.I. Bill, where he earned a Bachelor of Science in psychology. Henderson then earned a Ph.D. in psychology from the University of Cambridge with the support of a Gates Cambridge Scholarship.

== Luxury beliefs ==
Henderson has published a variety of essays about his education and political views in major outlets including The New York Times, The Wall Street Journal, and The Times. In his editorials, he develops the idea of "luxury beliefs", defined as ideas that "confer status on members of the upper class at little cost while inflicting costs on persons in lower classes." This term has gained considerable popularity, including coverage in The Atlantic and The Economist, as well as features on podcasts including Honestly with Bari Weiss and The Jordan B. Peterson Podcast.

== Troubled: A Memoir of Foster Care, Family, and Social Class ==
In his memoir, Henderson details his experience of being abandoned by his mother and growing up in the foster care system. He explains the emotional challenges he has faced due to the absence of a stable family. The latter section of the book details his educational journey and the experiences which inspired his development of the term "luxury beliefs".

A 2024 investigation by The Economist on the question of whether the New York Times Bestseller List had a political bias reported that Henderson's book had been omitted from the list despite selling enough copies to rank at least in fourth place. Henderson's exclusion had earlier been denounced as a sign of political bias by Elon Musk.

== See also ==
- Costly signaling theory in evolutionary psychology
