= Limousine liberal =

Pejorative political term

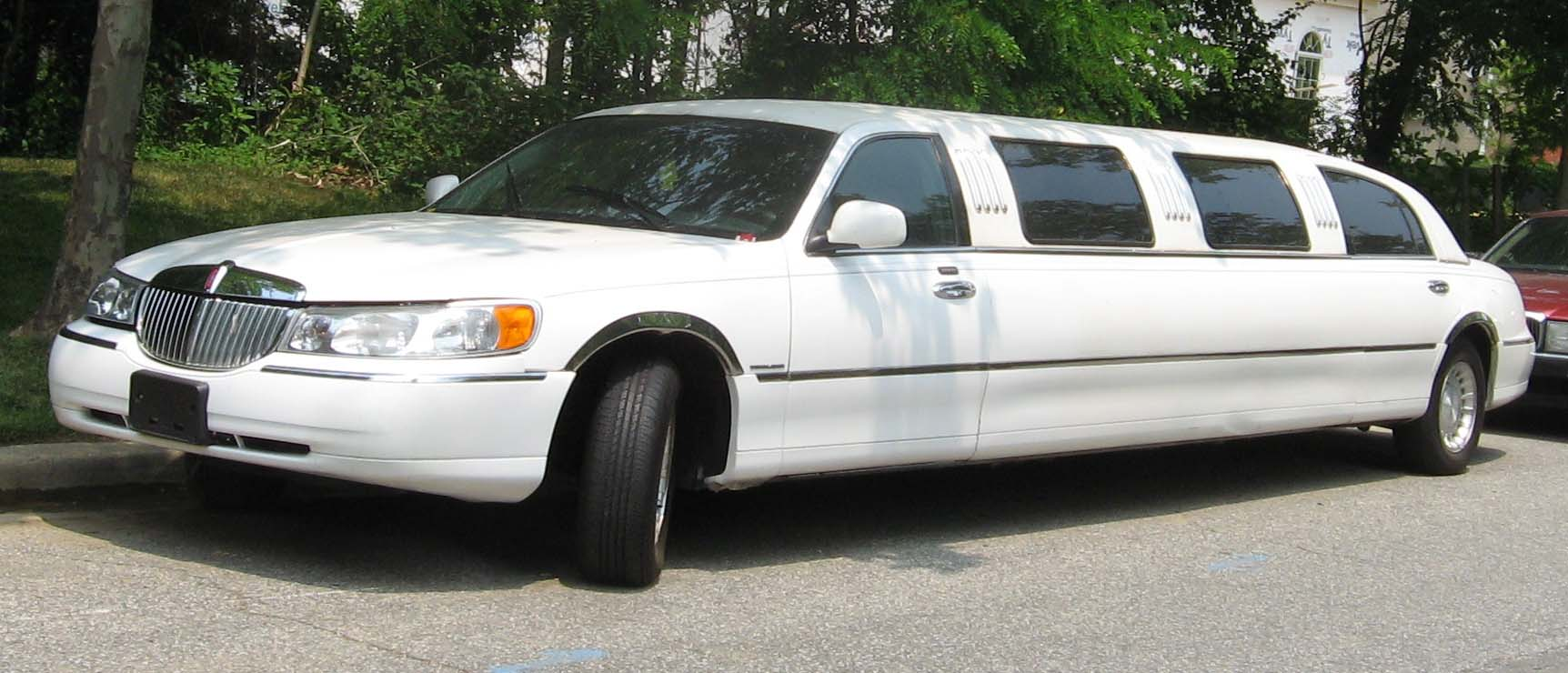
The term references limousines as a symbol of affluence.

Limousine liberal is a pejorative term originating in the United States to describe affluent individuals who publicly champion liberal or progressive policies aimed at addressing inequality and social issues (such as expansive welfare programs, strict environmental regulations, or permissive criminal justice reforms) while their substantial wealth and insulated lifestyles exempt them from bearing the primary costs or disruptions these policies impose on lower-income or working-class populations. Related terms include "latte liberal", "liberal elite", "Brahmin Left", "champagne socialist", "silver-spoon socialist", "Mercedes Marxist", "Gangnam leftist", and "Red nobility".

== Formation and early use ==
=== Procaccino campaign ===
Democratic New York City mayoral hopeful Mario Procaccino coined the term "limousine liberal" to characterize incumbent mayor John Lindsay and his wealthy Manhattan backers during a heated 1969 campaign. Historian David Callahan says that Procaccino:

...conjured up an acid image of hypocritical wealthy dogooders insulated from the negative fallout of their bad ideas. This theme has remained a staple of conservative attacks ever since.‍

It was a populist and producerist epithet, carrying an implicit accusation that the people it described were insulated from all negative consequences of their programs purported to benefit the poor and that the costs and consequences of such programs would be borne in the main by working-class or lower-middle class people who were not so poor as to be beneficiaries themselves. In particular, Procaccino criticized Lindsay for favoring unemployed minorities, e.g. blacks and Hispanics, over working-class white ethnics.‍

One Procaccino campaign memo criticized "rich super-assimilated people who live on Fifth Avenue and maintain some choice mansions outside the city and have no feeling for the small middle class shopkeeper, home owner, etc. They preach the politics of confrontation and condone violent upheaval in society because they are not touched by it and are protected by their courtiers".‍ The Independent later stated that "Lindsay came across as all style and no substance, a 'limousine liberal' who knew nothing of the concerns of the same 'silent majority' that was carrying Richard Nixon to the White House at the very same time."‍

=== Desegregation ===
After the U.S. Supreme Court ruled against school integration delays in Alexander v. Holmes County Board of Education, former Alabama governor George Wallace denounced the court's decision and called the Justices "limousine hypocrites".‍ Wallace continued this line of attack when he ran for governor again in 1970, as Steve Fraser notes:

[H]e railed against "rich folks" in their country clubs and "big old houses" drinking "those martinis with their little fingers up in the air" who were calling for integrated schools. "And guess where their children go to school. They go to lily white private school. They've bought above it all."‍

== Later use ==
The New York Observer applied the term to 2008 Democratic presidential candidate John Edwards, who paid $400 for a haircut (equivalent to $600 in 2025‍) and, according to the newspaper, "lectures about poverty while living in gated opulence".‍‍

Civil rights leader Al Sharpton used the term latte liberal to criticize (mostly white and high-income) left-leaning people "sit[ing] around the Hamptons" who advocated for the "defund the police" movement and ignored the concerns of African-Americans that suffer under high crime rates and rely on a strong police force.‍‍‍

== See also ==
- Boba liberal – Pejorative term for Asians in the West
- Bobo (socio-economic group) – French socio-economic group
- Champagne socialist – Pejorative political term
- Chattering class – Description for politically active middle class
- Gauche caviar – Pejorative political term
- Liberal elite – Term for politically liberal people
- Luxury belief – Beliefs held to convey social status
- Radical chic – Fashionable association of high-class people with political radicalism
