= Radical chic =

Fashionable association of high-class people with political radicalism

Composer Leonard Bernstein (seated) and his wife, Felicia Montealegre, with Black Panthers Field Marshal Donald L. Cox (right), at a fundraiser for the Black Panthers in January 1970 at the Bernsteins' apartment on Park Avenue in New York City. The photo appeared in the New York magazine article that spawned the term "radical chic".

Radical chic is the fashionable practice of upper-class people associating with politically radical people and causes. The journalist Tom Wolfe coined the term in his article "Radical Chic: That Party at Lenny's", which New York magazine published in June 1970. The term has since become widely used in American English, French and Italian. Unlike dedicated activists, revolutionaries or dissenters, those who engage in "radical chic" remain frivolous political agitators—ideologically invested in their cause of choice only so far as it advances their liberal elite social standing.

The concept has been described as "an exercise in double-tracking one's public image: on the one hand, defining oneself through committed allegiance to a radical cause, but on the other, vitally, demonstrating this allegiance because it is the fashionable, au courant way to be seen in moneyed, name-conscious Society." "Terrorist chic" is a modern expression with similar connotations. This derivative, however, de-emphasizes the class satire of Wolfe's original term, instead accentuating concerns over the semiotics of radicalism (such as the aestheticization of violence).

== Origin and meaning ==
The phrase "radical chic" originated in a 1970 New York article by Tom Wolfe, titled "Radical Chic: That Party at Lenny's", which was later reprinted in his books Radical Chic & Mau-Mauing the Flak Catchers and The Purple Decades. In the essay, Wolfe used the term to satirize composer Leonard Bernstein and his friends for their absurdity in hosting a fundraising party for the Black Panthers—an organization whose members, activities, and goals were clearly incongruous with those of Bernstein's elite circle. Wolfe's concept of radical chic was intended to lampoon individuals (particularly social elites like the jet set) who endorsed leftist radicalism merely to affect worldliness, assuage white guilt, or garner prestige, rather than to affirm genuine political convictions.

[Wolfe's] subject is how culture's patrician classes – the wealthy, fashionable intimates of high society – have sought to luxuriate in both a vicarious glamour and a monopoly on virtue through their public espousal of street politics: a politics, moreover, of minorities so removed from their sphere of experience and so absurdly, diametrically, opposed to the islands of privilege on which the cultural aristocracy maintain their isolation, that the whole basis of their relationship is wildly out of kilter from the start. ... In short, Radical Chic is described as a form of highly developed decadence; and its greatest fear is to be seen not as prejudiced or unaware, but as middle-class.

— Michael Bracewell, "Molotov Cocktails"

== Background ==
The concept of "fashionable" espousal of radical causes by members of wealthy society in this case had been argued against by Bernstein's wife, Felicia Montealegre, prior to the publication of "Radical Chic: That Party at Lenny's", a fact Wolfe details in it. The essay appeared in the June 8, 1970 issue of New York, 20 weeks after the actual fund raiser at the Bernstein residence was held on January 14. The first report of the event—which raised money in support of the Panther 21—appeared the following day in a piece by The New York Times style reporter Charlotte Curtis, who was in attendance. Curtis wrote in part: "Leonard Bernstein and a Black Panther leader argued the merits of the Black Panther party's philosophy before nearly 90 guests last night in the Bernsteins' elegant Park Avenue duplex." According to Wolfe, the release of the story worldwide was followed by strong criticism of the event: "The English, particularly, milked the story for all it was worth and seemed to derive one of the great cackles of the year from it."

The negative reaction prompted publication of an op-ed in the Times on January 16 entitled "False Note on Black Panthers" that was severely critical of the Black Panther Party and Bernstein:

Emergence of the Black Panthers as the romanticized darlings of the politico-cultural jet set is an affront to the majority of black Americans. ... the group therapy plus fund-raising soiree at the home of Leonard Bernstein, as reported in this newspaper yesterday, represents the sort of elegant slumming that degrades patrons and patronized alike. It might be dismissed as guilt-relieving fun spiked with social consciousness, except for its impact on those blacks and whites seriously working for complete equality and social justice.

Felicia Montealegre wrote and personally delivered a response to this op-ed to the Times offices. In her response she wrote:

As a civil libertarian, I asked a number of people to my house on Jan. 14 in order to hear the lawyer and others involved with the Panther 21 discuss the problem of civil liberties as applicable to the men now waiting trial, and to help raise funds for their legal expenses. ... It was for this deeply serious purpose that our meeting was called. The frivolous way in which it was reported as a "fashionable" event is unworthy of the Times, and offensive to all people who are committed to humanitarian principles of justice.

== Related terms ==
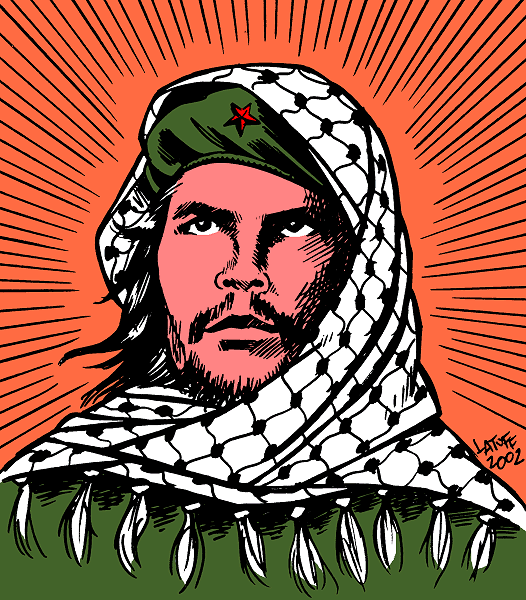
A 2002 political cartoon by Carlos Latuff depicting Che Guevara wearing a Palestinian keffiyeh

Terrorist chic (also known as "terror chic" or "militant chic") is a more recent and specific variation of the term. It refers to the appropriation of symbols, objects, and aesthetics related to radical militants, usually in the context of pop culture or fashion. When such imagery is deployed subversively, the process exemplifies aestheticization of propaganda. Regardless, because terrorist chic derives its iconography from groups and individuals often associated with violent conflict or terrorism, the term carries a greater pejorative tone than "radical chic."

Instances of terrorist chic have variously been interpreted as morally irresponsible, earnestly counter-cultural, ironically hip, or benignly apolitical. According to Henry K. Miller of the New Statesman, the most well-known example is the ubiquitous appearance of Marxist revolutionary Che Guevara in popular culture. Other cases that have been labeled terrorist chic include: the Prada-Meinhof fashion line (a pun on Prada and the Baader-Meinhof Gang) and the fashion of combining keffiyehs and military-style clothing such as camo prints and heavy boots, outside the Arab World.

Shortly after the October 17, 1997 burial with military honors in Santa Clara, Cuba, of Guevara's disinterred and identified remains, found in the Bolivian jungle by forensic anthropologists, New York Times columnist Richard Bernstein argued that the third-world revolution that Che embodied was no longer even a "drawing-room, radical-chic hope". Concurrent with his re-burial, three major Guevara biographies were published in 1997. Noting the sustained interest in Che, Bernstein suggested that "the end of the cold war and the failure of the third-world revolution" allowed for the "scrutiny of Guevara, [as] a symbol of both the idealism and the moral blindness of the decade of protest" to take place in a context "free of ideological partisanship and rancor." Ted Balaker, editor-in-chief of Reason TV, an American libertarian website, wrote and produced Killer Chic in 2008, a libertarian, anti-Communist documentary, in which he deconstructed the use of images of Che Guevara and Mao Zedong in popular culture. In his blog entry on 11 December 2008, Reason journalist Nick Gillespie used the term "killer chic" in his review of Steven Soderbergh's film Che.

== See also ==
- Baizuo
- Champagne socialist
- Che Guevara in fashion
- Gauche caviar
- Lifestyle anarchism
- Limousine liberal
- Bisexual chic
- List of chics
- Nostalgie de la boue
- Porno chic
- Redwashing
- Social justice warrior
- Virtue signalling
- Woke
