= Festive left =

Brazilian political term

In Brazilian political terminology, the festive left (in Portuguese: esquerda festiva) refers to left-wing political activists, generally young university students, who are more concerned with the parties and socializing that stem from political activism than with the activism itself. The expression emerged during the Brazilian military dictatorship to designate middle-class students, artists, and intellectuals who did not take part in the armed struggle, but who advocated for the overthrow of the dictatorship at parties and bars.

Seen as an evolution of the term "festive left," the "cirandeira left" (esquerda cirandeira) emerged in the 2010s during protests against the impeachment of then-President Dilma Rousseff, when members of the Workers' Cause Party prevented activists from the Socialism and Liberty Party from dancing a ciranda circle dance as part of the protest. The term refers to left-wing activists who carry out playful, symbolic, and peaceful actions as forms of protest, but which are ineffective in promoting real structural change. It also criticizes a discourse that focuses more on identity and cultural agendas than on the needs of the country's working classes.
