= Regressive left =

Pejorative term for overly tolerant left-wing politics

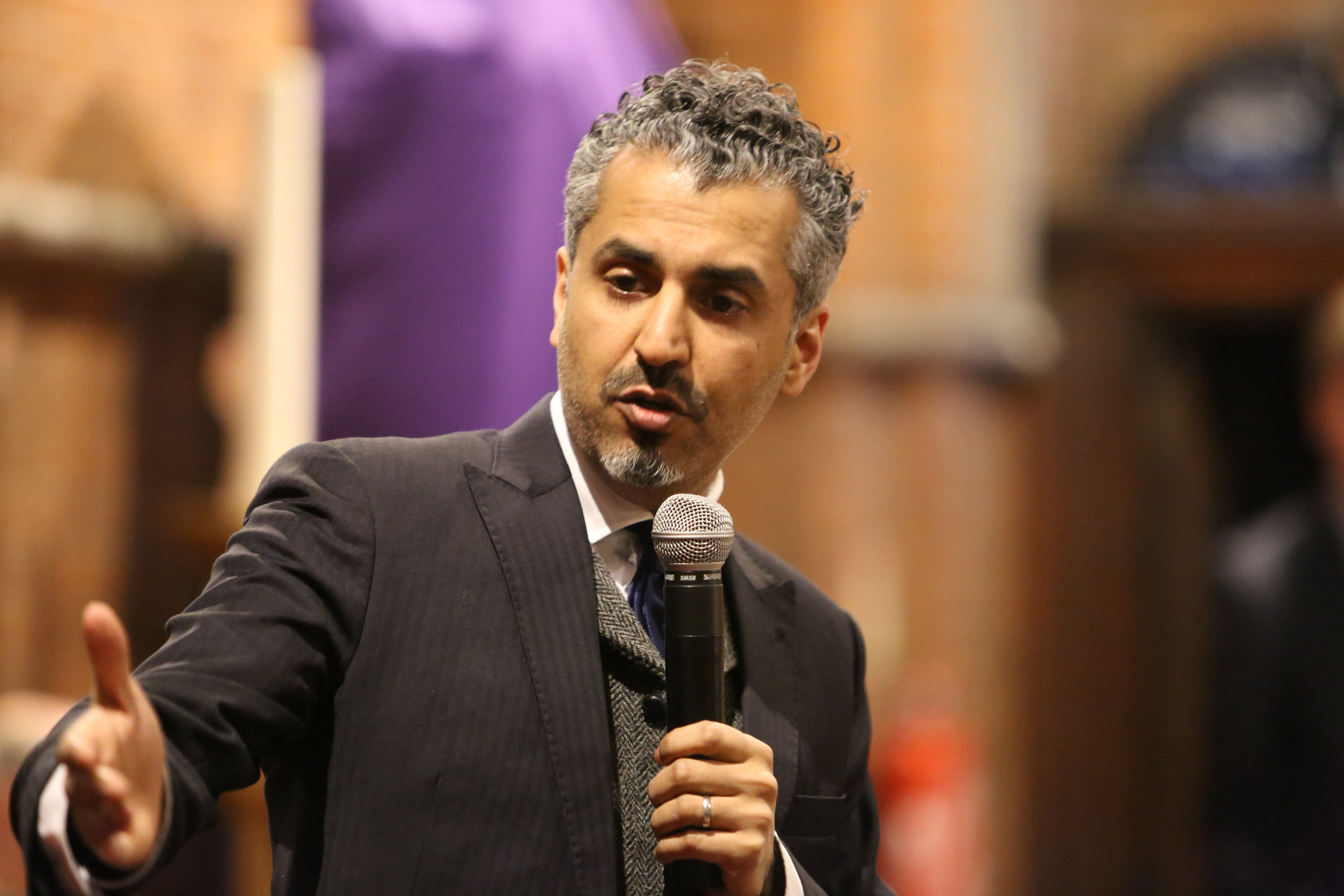
Maajid Nawaz's use of the phrase regressive left has been a part of his opposition to Islamism, the Qur'anic literalist pole of Islam that emphasises Sharia (Islamic law), pan-Islamic political unity, and an Islamic state

Regressive left, also referred to as regressive liberals or regressive leftists, is a pejorative term to describe by its proponents a branch of left-wing politics that is accused of being accepting of, or sympathetic to, views that conflict with liberal principles, particularly by tolerating Islamism and other authoritarian positions, like promoting censorship. Among those who have used the term are the British political activist Maajid Nawaz, American political talk-show hosts Bill Maher and Dave Rubin, and New Atheist writers, such as Sam Harris and Richard Dawkins.

== Concept ==
In 2007, Maajid Nawaz, a former Islamist who had renounced his association with the radical Islamist group Hizb ut-Tahrir in favour of secular Islam, used the phrase regressive left to describe left-leaning people who, according to him, pander to Islamism, which he defines as a "global totalitarian theo-political project" with a "desire to impose any given interpretation of Islam over society as law". He opposes this on the grounds that "any desire to impose any version of Islam over anyone anywhere, ever, is a fundamental violation of our basic civil liberties". Nawaz believes that it is possible to denounce both neoconservative foreign policies, such as the Iraq War, which he opposed, and theocratic extremism; he labels as regressive leftists those who fail to do so.

== Usage ==
In September 2015, Nawaz and Sam Harris participated in a public forum hosted by Harvard University's Institute of Politics, which was later published in a short book, Islam and the Future of Tolerance (2015). In a review of the book in the magazine National Review Online, the political writer Brian Stewart said that according to both Nawaz and Harris, regressive leftists in the West are "willfully blind" to the fact that jihadists and Islamists make up a significant portion (20% in Harris's estimate) of the global Muslim community and the minority Muslim communities within the West, even though these factions are opposed to liberal values, such as individual autonomy, freedom of expression, democracy, women's rights, and gay rights. Nawaz and Harris denounce what they describe as the paradoxically illiberal, isolationist, and censuring attitude towards any criticism of that phenomenon, which they contend betray universal liberal values and abandon supporting and defending the most vulnerable liberal members living within the Muslim community, such as women, homosexuals, and apostates.

In October 2015, The Washington Times reported that the American comedian and show host Bill Maher and British biologist and New Atheist author Richard Dawkins had "lamented regressive leftists who fail to understand they are anything but liberal when it comes to Islam". Maher cited a willingness to criticise anything except Islam but to excuse it as "their culture", to which Dawkins responded: "Well, to hell with their culture." Referring to student initiatives to disinvite ex-Muslim speakers on campus, Dawkins saw this as "a betrayal of the Free Speech Movement of the 1960s".

In October and November 2015, Harris frequently used the term in his exchanges with the media, and said that the greatest danger is that the regressive left is willing to give up freedom of speech "out of fear of offending minorities", which would lead to censorship imposed by those minorities. He cited American journalist Glenn Greenwald's comments on the Charlie Hebdo shooting as an example. Harris considers Reza Aslan and Noam Chomsky to be of the regressive left. During a 2015 interview on The Rubin Report, Nawaz cited Britain's Labour Party leader Jeremy Corbyn as an example of someone he deems part of the regressive left by citing that Corbyn was anti-war but also "historically very close" to supporters of violent Islamist organisations, such as Hamas and Hezbollah.

In November 2015, in an appearance on the talk radio show The Humanist Hour, the philosopher Peter Boghossian defined the term as a pejorative used to describe those on the left that have made the "strangest bedfellows" with Islamists. According to him, regressive contrasts progressive, the former being a group that "[looks] for the worst in people ... and [does] not extend hermeneutics of charity, or a charitable interpretation of anything anyone says, but uses it as a hammer to beat people down."

In late 2015, the talk show host Dave Rubin hosted discussions about the regressive left in several The Rubin Report segments. Rubin described the regressive left as "the left's version of the Tea Party" and said that the regressive left would damage the Democratic Party similarly to the way that the Tea Party movement damaged the Republican Party.

== Reception ==
In November 2015, the psychiatrist Khwaja Khusro Tariq, writing for The Huffington Post, classified the term as an unsubstantiated ad hominem attack, and stated that the strongest critics of Islam are courted by both liberal and conservative media in the United States. Khusro also said that the term had been directed towards Glenn Greenwald and Noam Chomsky, and said that both of them never condoned violence or opined on the doctrine of Islam. He argued that there was no genuine inhibition on speaking against the religion.

In March 2016, the BuzzFeed News reporter Joseph Bernstein wrote that according to Google Trends, interest in the term "shot up" in late 2015. According to Bernstein, instead of criticizing "cultural tolerance gone too far", the phrase has "become a catch-all for any element of the dominant new media culture that the anti-social justice warrior internet doesn't like." He suggested that even though the term could be sourced back to self-identified liberal commentators like Nawaz, Maher, and Dawkins, it was frequently being used by the alt-right and other anti-social justice warrior groups on Internet forums and social media as part of their rhetorical warfare.

== See also ==
- Baizuo
- Horseshoe theory
- Paradox of tolerance
- Red-green-brown alliance
