= Bobo (socio-economic group) =

French socio-economic group

Bobo is a portmanteau used to describe the socio-economic bourgeois-bohemian group in France. The geographer Christophe Guilluy has used the term to describe France's elite class, whom he accuses of being responsible for many of France's current problems.

The term was introduced into the English language by the cultural commentator David Brooks to describe the 1990s descendants of the yuppies in the book Bobos in Paradise (2000). Brooks describes Bobos as "highly educated folk who have one foot in the bohemian world of creativity and another foot in the bourgeois realm of ambition and worldly success". Brooks describes the relation between the two cultural groups in Paris starting in the 1820s when the Bourgeoisie had "displaced the aristocracy as the moving group in society" and the bohemians "really rose up" to express their disgust, expressed by Stendhal:

"Hatred of the bourgeoisie is the beginning of all virtues, and they make him want to weep and vomit at the same time."

According to Brooks, the two groups continued to coexist in a culture war for decades, with the bohemians displaying contempt, loathing, etc. for their enemy, and the bourgeoisie ignoring the bohemians and embracing "useful, prosaic virtues: self-discipline, frugality, order, punctuality, moderation, industry, temperance, fidelity, and faith". Further,

[The] bourgeois were materialists and the bohemians were antimaterialists. The bourgeois were polite; the bohemians were raw. The bourgeois were career-oriented, so the bohemians were experience-oriented. The bourgeois pretended to be chaste, and the bohemians pretended to be promiscuous.

In the 1960s, a sea change occurred, when bohemianism evolved (in the United States at least) from a fringe phenomenon of artists and writers, to a mass movement sometimes called the counterculture or Hippie movement. They opposed political situations such as the Vietnam War, and segregation, as well as the social institutions of Bourgeois values, as expressed by Theodore Roczak in his 1970 book, The Making of the Counter Culture:

The bourgeoisie [...] is obsessed by greed. Its sex life is insipid and prudish. Its family patterns are debased. Its slavish conformities of dress and grooming are degrading. Its mercenary routinization of life is intolerable[.]

Brooks describes middle class conformists as finally paying attention to bohemians and reacting against them in the 1980s by becoming "Yuppies" (a "sort of bourgeois on steroids"). Conservative authors decried the "self-indulgent nihilism" and social destructiveness of bohemianism. Still, although the counterculture did not overthrow capitalism, it did have a significant cultural impact. By 2000, when Brooks was writing, "arty coffee shops", "gourmet bread stores", "vegetarian dog biscuits", "Basmati rice", and "all-natural hair colorings", that had previously been the domain of counterculture bohemians, had spread to conservative upper and upper middle class communities.

They've taken all the things that were from the '60s of interest to teenagers, like free love and nudity, and gotten rid of them, and kept all the things that are of interest to middle-aged hypochondriacs, like whole grains and fancy rice.

Along with the generational influence of the counterculture, Brooks claims that capitalism evolved to produce an "information age", where "ideas and creativity are as important as finance capital and natural resources to producing wealth", and ideas and creativity are within the world of bohemia.

== See also ==
- Bobo brand, a product that is sold under a relatively unfamiliar brand name
- Renaud, the French popular singer and activist, wrote "Les Bobos" as the first song of his 2006 album Rouge Sang
- Hipster (contemporary subculture), a related social group
- Creative class
- Professional-managerial Class
