= Karelian Birch (Fabergé egg) =

1917 Imperial Fabergé egg

Karelian Birch Fabergé egg
- Year delivered: Unfinished and undelivered (1917)
- Customer: Nicholas II
- Recipient: Maria Feodorovna

Current owner
- Individual or institution: Lost

Design and materials
- Workmaster: Henrik Wigström
- Materials used: Birch; gold
- Surprise: Portrait miniatures by Zuiev?

The Karelian Birch egg, also known as the Birch Egg, was an unfinished 1917 Easter egg designed under the supervision of Peter Carl Fabergé for the last Tsar of Russia, Nicholas II, as an Easter gift to his mother, the Dowager Empress Maria Feodorovna. It was the second to last Fabergé egg made, before Constellation. Its present whereabouts is unknown.

The Birch Egg was due to be completed and delivered to the Tsar on Easter 1917. Before the egg was delivered however, the February Revolution took place and Nicholas II was forced to abdicate on 15 March.

A number of the Fabergé Imperial Easter eggs created during World War I, utilized less costly materials. However, the Karelian Birch egg was the only one to use an organic substance (wood) as a primary construction element.

== History and description ==
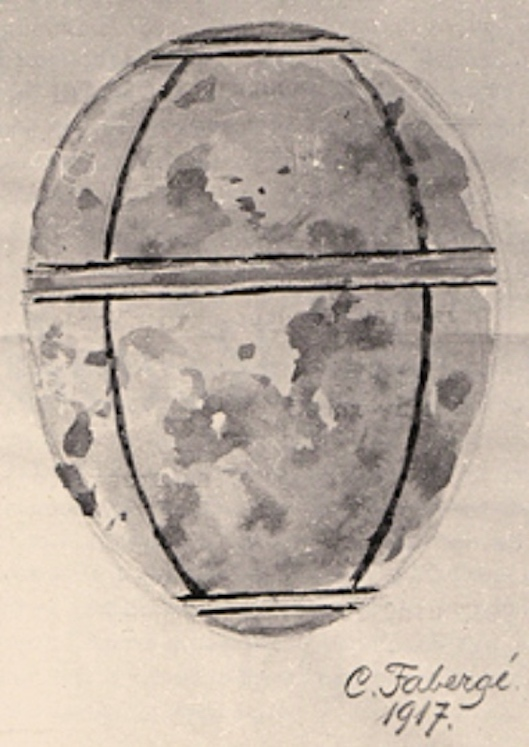
1917 sketch for the Karelian Birch Egg by Fabergé. The shell of the egg was designed in two halves which could be opened to reveal a surprise.

Fabergé's eldest son, Eugène, told Henry Bainbridge (author of Peter Carl Fabergé. Goldsmith and Jeweller to the Russian Imperial Court, 1949) that as far as he could remember, the dowager empress’s 1917 Easter egg was to be of Karelian birch. This one-line reference was all that was known of it until Tatiana Fabergé uncovered new evidence in her family files. She found a letter from Franz Birbaum, Fabergé’s chief designer, to Eugène Fabergé in August 1922. It says:

Another egg referred to by Wigström must be the simple wooden one with slight mounting which was to have been presented in 1917, but which Kerensky did not allow to be delivered to the Tsar.

Likewise, Birbaum says in his memoirs in 1919:

The Eggs made for Easter 1917 were unfinished; there was a proposal from a person unknown to me that the eggs should be completed and sold to him but the proposal was rejected by the firm.

== Surprise ==
Virtually nothing is known about the possible surprise. A wooden egg with surprise inside is described in an inventory made of treasures taken from the palace of Grand Duke Vladimir Alexandrovich, brother to Tsar Alexander III, five days after the 1917 October Revolution. However, this is probably a different egg, since it appears to be finished and did not belong to the dowager empress:

Wooden egg in gold setting, inside and elephant, mechanical, silver and gold, with rose-cut diamonds.

Birbaum states in the abovementioned memoirs written in 1919 that the two Easter eggs for 1917 were both unfinished.

On the other hand, in August 1922 Birbaum mentions in a letter to Fabergé's eldest son, Eugène, what may well be the Karelian Birch Egg and its surprise:

It is quite possible that these were orders to Carl Gustavovich [Fabergé] with miniatures by Zuiev, but as I did not design them, I cannot say anything about them.

== Authenticity ==
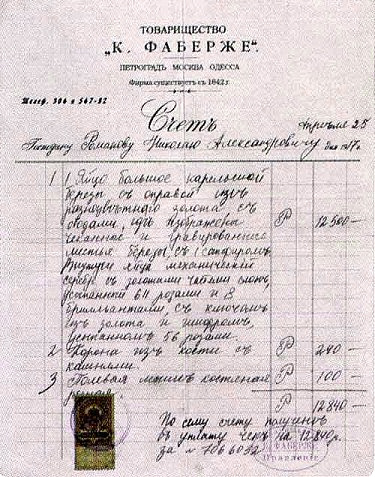
The alleged Fabergé "original" invoice.

In November 2002, it was announced that the 1917 Karelian Birch Easter Egg by Fabergé had been purchased by the privately owned Russian National Museum in Moscow (a group of Russian collectors), which has no premises. Alexander Ivanov, the director of the Museum, declined to name the Egg's previous owner, who he said lived in London and descended from a family of Russian emigres, saying only that the Egg cost the museum "millions of dollars".

For several years now, this questioned Egg has been on display at Ivanov's Fabergé Museum in Baden-Baden, which houses his Fabergé/Fauxbergé collection. The complete purchase, consisted of the egg itself, the case, the wind-up key for the surprise (a mechanical miniature elephant), Fabergé's "original" invoice to Nicholas II, and a letter from Fabergé to Alexander Kerensky complaining about not being paid and asking that the egg be delivered. The surprise itself was not in the collector's possession.

In an article published in 2005 in The Art Newspaper, experts discussed controversy on the authenticity of this and another "Imperial" Easter egg (Constellation Egg) owned by Ivanov, with experts attesting the authenticity of the Karelian Birch egg in his collection.

Likewise, this egg was included in the catalogue (although not exhibited) of a controversial exhibition held in the Hermitage Museum titled "Fabergé: Jeweller to the Imperial Court" (25 November 2020 – 14 March 2021), along with five other eggs from Ivanov's museum in Baden-Baden, all of which were identified as Fauxbergé by experts.

== Sources ==
- Faber, Toby (2008). Faberge's Eggs: The Extraordinary Story of the Masterpieces That Outlived an Empire. Random House. ISBN 978-1-4000-6550-9.
- Forbes, Christopher; Prinz von Hohenzollern, Johann Georg (1990). FABERGE; The Imperial Eggs. Prestel. ASIN B000YA9GOM.
- Lowes, Will (2001). Fabergé Eggs: A Retrospective Encyclopedia. Scarecrow Press. ISBN 0-8108-3946-6.
- Snowman, A Kenneth (1988). Carl Faberge: Goldsmith to the Imperial Court of Russia. Gramercy. ISBN 0-517-40502-4.
