= Fersman =

Fersman may refer to:

- Alexander Fersman (1883-1945), Russian and Soviet geochemist and mineralogist
- Fersman (crater)
- Fersman Mineralogical Museum
