= Constellation (Fabergé egg) =

1917 Imperial Fabergé egg

Constellation Fabergé egg
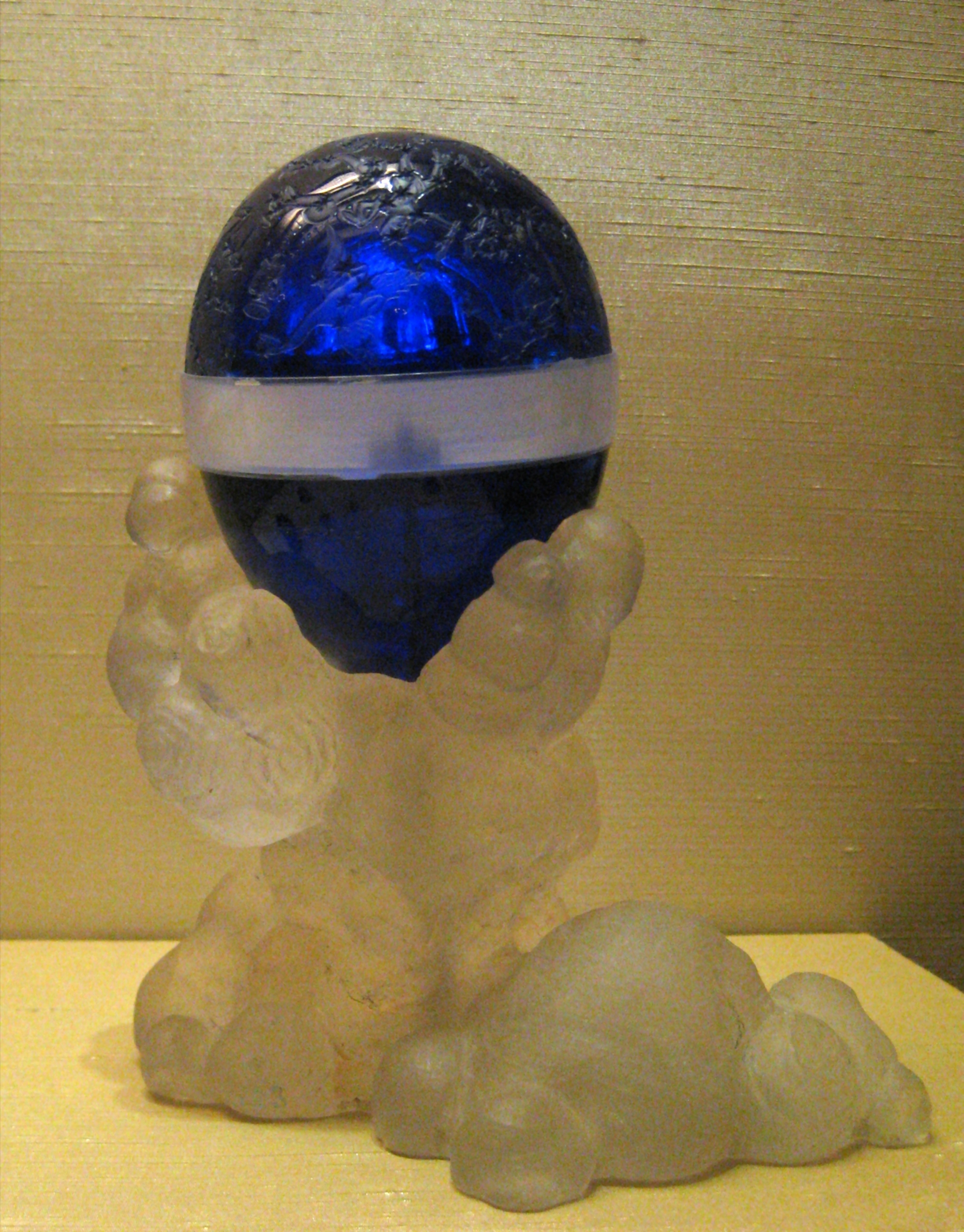
- Unfinished egg from Fersman Mineralogical Museum (a modern Plexiglass band joins the two halves of the egg)
- Year delivered: Unfinished and undelivered (1917)
- Customer: Nicholas II
- Recipient: Alexandra Feodorovna

Current owner
- Individual or institution: Fersman Mineralogical Museum
- Year of acquisition: 1925

Design and materials
- Materials used: Glass and rock crystal
- Surprise: None (clock egg)

The Constellation egg is an unfinished 1917 Easter egg designed under the supervision of Peter Carl Fabergé for the last Tsar of Russia, Nicholas II, as an Easter gift to his wife, the Tsarina Alexandra Feodorovna. It was the last "Imperial" Fabergé egg designed.

The egg was due to be completed and delivered to the Tsar on Easter 1917. Before the egg was delivered however, the February Revolution took place and Nicholas II was forced to abdicate on 15 March.

== History, description and authenticity ==
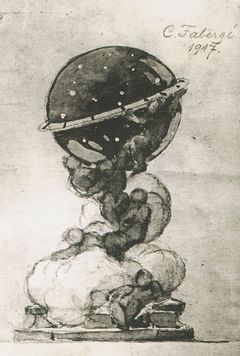
1917 plan Sketch of the Constellation Egg

According to Franz Birbaum, Fabergé’s workshop manager, the egg was conceived as a clock in the form of a celestial globe of dark blue glass encircled by a rotating dial, held above billowing rock crystal clouds surmounted by silver cherubs; the whole supported on a nephrite pedestal. The globe was to be decorated with a diamond studded engraving of the constellations under which Tsarevitch Alexei was born. Work began on the egg, but the 1917 February Revolution and subsequent events overtook its production.

Birbaum tells in a letter written in August 1922 to Fabergé's eldest son, Eugene, the following:

One thing I remember for certain is the order of an egg for the Tsar by Ivashev [a designer of the company] and Carl Gustavovich [Fabergé]. This, you may remember, is an egg of dark blue glass incrusted with the constellation of the day of the Tsarevich’s birth. The egg is supported by silver cherubs and clouds of opaque rock crystal. Unless I am mistaken, the egg contained a clock with a revolving dial. The execution of this egg was interrupted by the war. The cherubs and the clouds were finished, but the egg itself with its incrustation and the pedestal were not finished. Where all this has disappeared to I have no idea, and when I visited the House after the raid, I found no trace of this article.

Likewise, Birbaum says in his memoirs in 1919:

The Eggs made for Easter 1917 were unfinished; there was a proposal from a person unknown to me that the eggs should be completed and sold to him but the proposal was rejected by the firm.

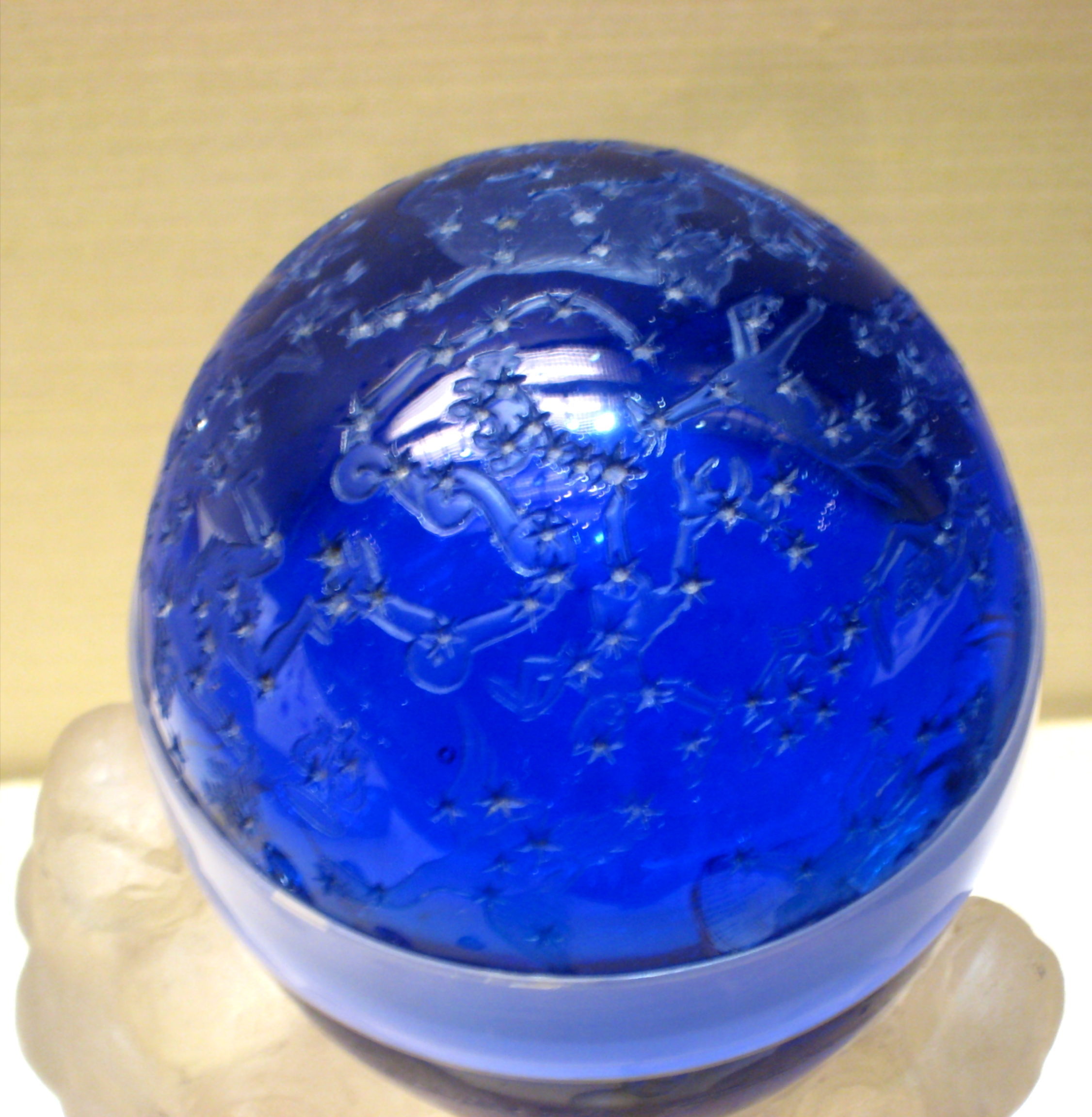
The egg's top is engraved with the star constellations the day tsarevich Alexei was born. Fersman Mineralogical Museum.

In 1925 the egg’s last owner, Fabergé's second son Agathon, delivered several dozen Fabergé pieces to the academician Alexander Fersman. Among these was an unfinished piece, comprising two halves of a dark-blue egg of cobalt glass and an unfinished base of rock crystal, made to resemble clouds. The clock dial and cupids, mentioned by Birbaum, were never found.

In 2001, the unfinished egg was identified in the collection of the Fersman Mineralogical Museum in Moscow. Experts believe it to be the unfinished 1917 egg by Fabergé. It lacks the diamonds, nephrite base and silver putti intended to decorate it. Its authenticity is supported by numerous studies by Russian experts.

Tatiana Muntian, Fabergé expert at the Kremlin Armoury, confirmed the discovery by comparing the three found pieces to the original sketch signed by Karl Fabergé in 1917, as well as:

Comparison of the details from the Fersman Mineralogical Museum of the Russian Academy of Science with documentary and archive sources, the Museum's unquestionable source and eighty-year-old museum history allow us to state unequivocally that the unfinished Constellation of the Tsarevich Egg was indeed preserved. Russian specialists, art historians from The Moscow Kremlin Museums, State Historical Museum, All-Russian State Museum of Decorative and Applied Art made their own attributions concerning the Fersman Museum object. There are also technological expert statement made by the State Scientific Institute of Restoration.

The Russian art collector Alexander Ivanov claims that he owns the original (and finished) egg. In 2003–2004 he said that he acquired this egg in the late 1990s and affirmed that "the Fersman Museum erroneously continues to claim that it has the original egg." Fabergé experts do not agree and describe his egg as a Fauxbergé. Ivanov's egg is in the Fabergé Museum in Baden-Baden, which houses his collection.

== Sources ==
- Faber, Toby (2008). Faberge's Eggs: The Extraordinary Story of the Masterpieces That Outlived an Empire. Random House. ISBN 978-1-4000-6550-9.
- Forbes, Christopher; Prinz von Hohenzollern, Johann Georg (1990). FABERGE; The Imperial Eggs. Prestel. ASIN B000YA9GOM.
- Lowes, Will (2001). Fabergé Eggs: A Retrospective Encyclopedia. Scarecrow Press. ISBN 0-8108-3946-6.
- Snowman, A Kenneth (1988). Carl Faberge: Goldsmith to the Imperial Court of Russia. Gramercy. ISBN 0-517-40502-4.
