= Novelo (surname) =

Novelo is a surname. Notable people with the surname include:

- Cleominio Zoreda Novelo (born 1950), Mexican politician and lawyer
- Claudia Novelo (born 1965), Mexican synchronized swimmer
- Freddy Novelo (1960–2013), Mexican philanthropist and art collector
- Landy Berzunza Novelo (born 1965), Mexican politician
- Lupita Novelo (born 1967), Mexican tennis player
