= Fauxbergé =

Term to describe items that are faking a higher quality or status

Fauxbergé (Russian: фальшберже) is a term coined to generally describe items that are faking a higher quality or status and in specific terms relates to the House of Fabergé (Russian: Дом Фаберже), which was a Russian jewellery firm founded in 1842 in Saint Petersburg and nationalised by the Bolsheviks in 1918. The term was first mentioned in a publication by auctioneer and Fabergé book author Archduke Géza of Austria in his article "Fauxbergé", published in Art and Auction in 1994. He also used it during the exhibition "Fabergé in America" in 1996 and subsequent later ones.

Nowadays, the term is a part of the expertise vocabulary in the field of Fabergé; it is used to refer to items that are copies, counterfeits or pastiches of historical Fabergé products made between 1885 and 1917.

== History of genuine objects ==
The production of Fabergé objects around 1900 poured out a much vaster number of pieces than the popular perception. The reason for this was that only 50 Imperial Easter Eggs were completed, while general Fabergé objects and jewelry items could exist in high numbers. It is estimated that the Fabergé company produced over a half a million products between 1842 and 1917. With over 500 craftsmen and designers working for the company in its heyday, under Peter Carl Fabergé's 35-year tenure as head of the firm, it is believed that over 200,000 objects – from pins, brooches, bracelets, tiaras, umbrella handles, picture frames, flower studies, presentation boxes, snuff boxes, cigarette cases, clock cases and all sorts of objets d'art – were produced between 1882 and 1917. In its time, Fabergé had been the most recognized and most highly valued jewelry brand in the world, surpassing Cartier and others by far.

The company had its flagship store and main workshop in Saint Petersburg (1842). Later, four additional branches were added: Moscow (1887), Odessa (1901), London (1903) and Kiev (1906).

In response to a growing demand, apart from his own in-house workshops, Carl Fabergé worked with a number of outer workshops, managed by the so-called workmasters, who were in charge of a team of craftsmen, from jewelers, enamellers, goldsmiths, designers, etc. These semi-independent workshops were specialized in a particular area, e.g. producing frames, silver pieces, carved stone animals, etc. Each had its own distinctive style and the workmaster owned his own firm under the Fabergé umbrella, signing their own initials to their creations, along with the Fabergé hallmark. According to Habsburg, a sure way to sort out fakes is that Fabergé always used a maximum of two stamps and that most copies show more than two stamps.

Imitators were already a problem during the company's heyday and it is not always possible to distinguish the finer works of the Petersburg jewellers Ivan Britsyn, Alexander Tillander or Karl Hahn from Fabergé's mass output. Other competitors, such as Cartier and Tiffany's, also started to sell similar objects and even bought from the same sources, especially the stone animals, which are never stamped or engraved and can be mistaken for Fabergé originals.

== Notable figures ==
=== Armand Hammer ===
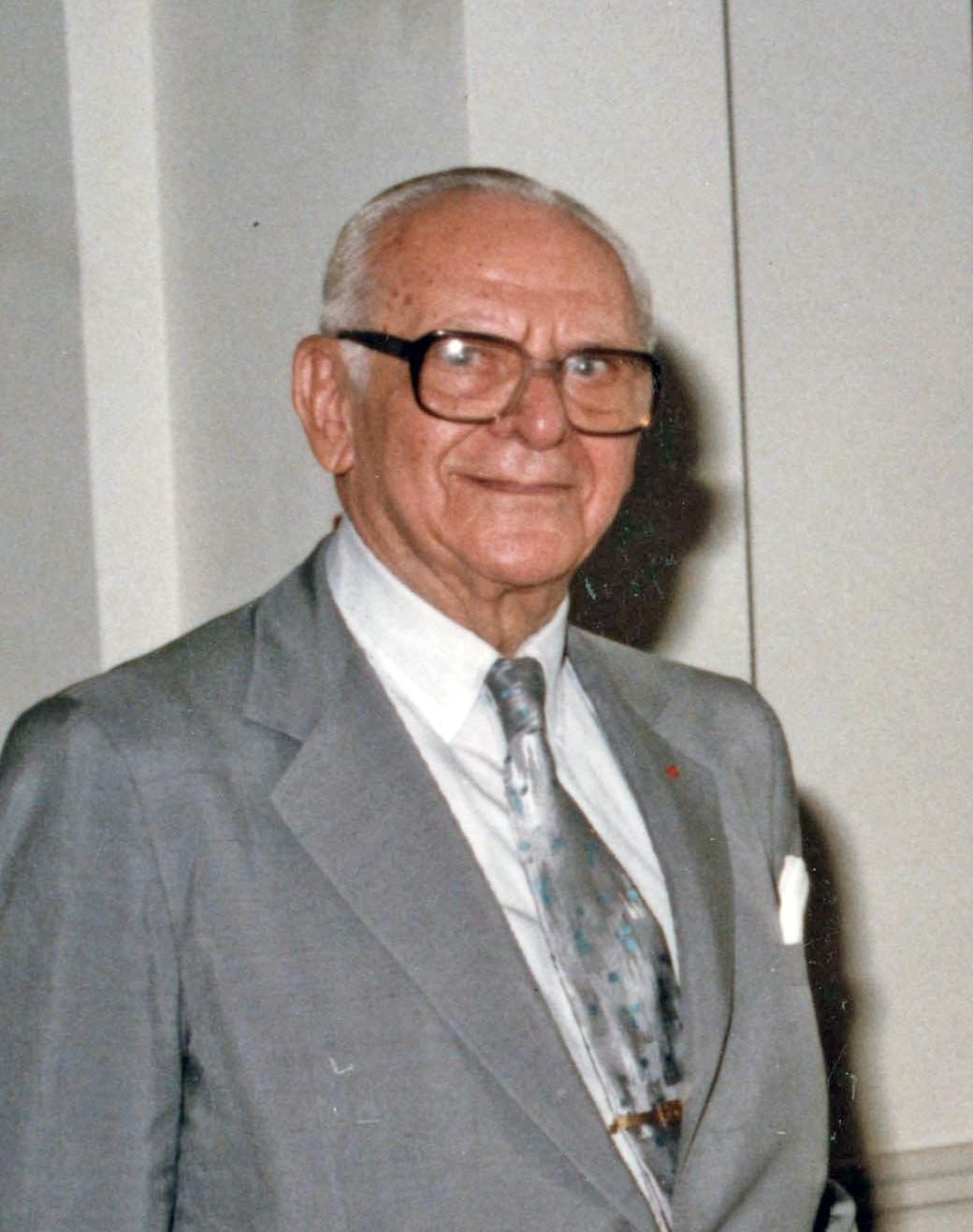
Armand Hammer in 1982

Armand Hammer was a well known dealer in Fabergé and Fauxbergé. According to Archduke Géza of Austria, Armand's brother Victor Hammer said that Stalin's trade commissar, Anastas Mikoyan, provided Fabergé hallmarking tools to Armand in order to sell fakes, and Victor mentioned a 1938 New York sale he ran with Armand, which grossed several million dollars, consisted of both genuine and faked items, with commissions going back to Mikoyan.

Edward Jay Epstein's book Dossier: The Secret History of Armand Hammer also confirms that he used a "set of the signature stamps of the Faberge workshops, so he could doctor unsigned items in the back room" and "was thus able to expand vastly the supply of Faberge." According to an account describing the process to his mistress:

His face beaming with pride, he demonstrated to Bettye how the nineteenth-century tools provided the appearance of an authentic Fabergé signature. He told her how collectors who fancied themselves experts on Fabergé were duped by the forgeries. He would let them discover the 'signature' on their own and then, if they told him about it, act surprised. Hammer thus enjoyed not merely the monetary profit from the sale but a sense of superiority in outwitting the art buyer.

=== Alexander Ivanov ===
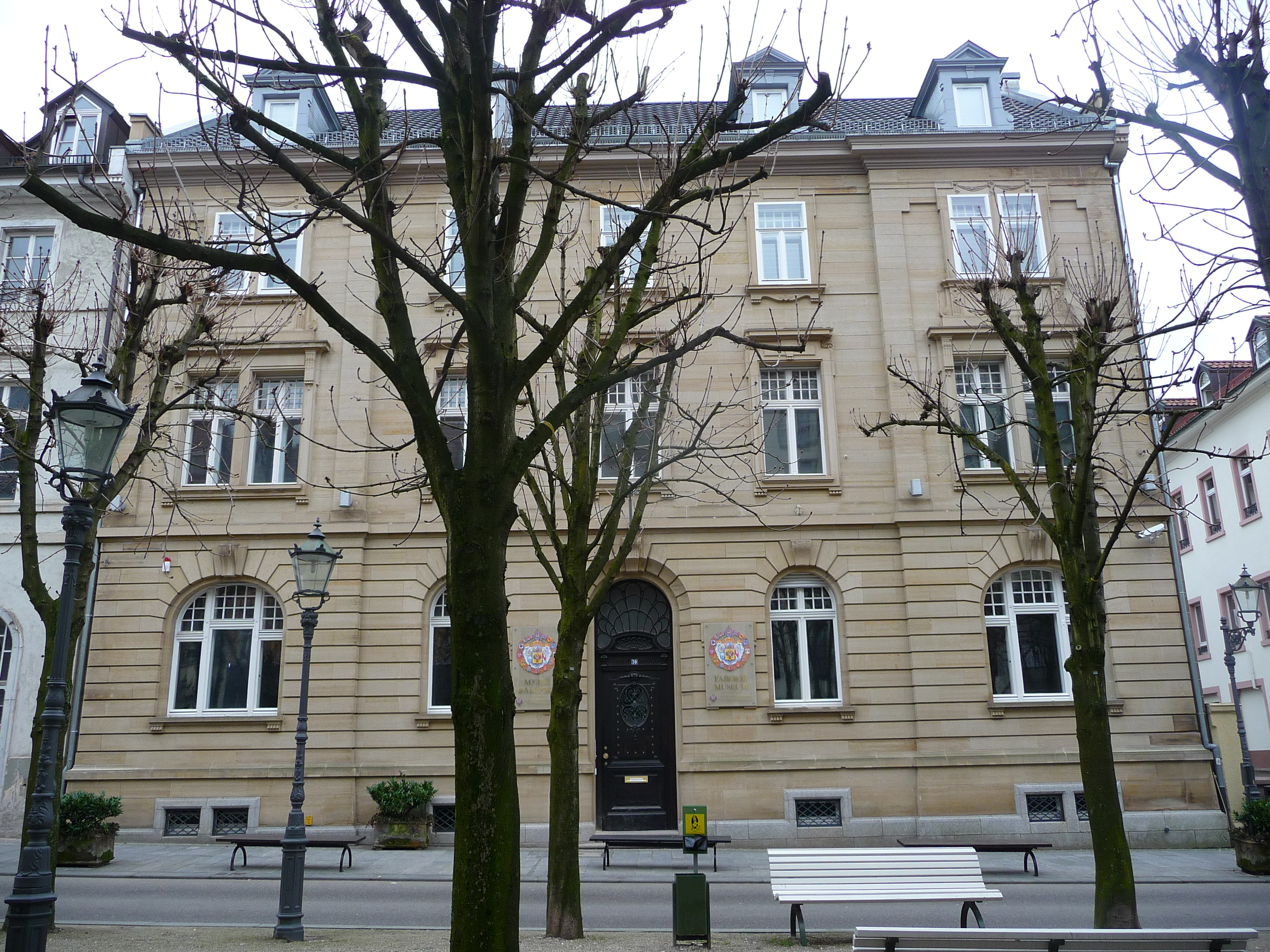
Ivanov's so-called Fabergé Museum in Baden-Baden (Germany), where his collection of Fauxbergé pieces are on display

In January 2021, an art dealer specializing in Russian art and Fabergé denounced in an open letter to the director of the Hermitage Museum Mikhail Piotrovsky and later articles that the exhibition "Fabergé: Jeweller to the Imperial Court" (25 November 2020 – 14 March 2021) had a number of fakes on display, including five eggs, in order to "legitimize counterfeits and enhance their market-value by exhibiting them in the Hermitage." The scandal was echoed by the international press.

Regarding those eggs, Geza von Habsburg told the BBC: "Judging by the photographs and descriptions published online, all of the so-called 're-found Fabergé Imperial Easter Eggs' from the museum in Baden-Baden displayed in this exhibition are fakes, in my opinion." Some other Fabergé experts, such as Alexander von Solodkoff and Ulla Tillander-Godenhielm, also doubted the authenticity.

Von Habsburg also expressed to The Art Newspaper: "What Ruzhnikov has written is in my opinion and in the opinion of a number of my colleagues, correct." "It is unusual for a museum to show items with no provenance or scholarly research to back up their authenticity."

No fewer than 65 of the 91 Fabergé items on display originated from the private museums of two interrelated Russian collectors: the Fabergé Museum in Baden-Baden (46 items), the Russian National Museum in Moscow (11), both linked to Alexander Ivanov, and the Museum of Christian Culture in St Petersburg (8), linked to Konstantin Goloshchapov, who also appears (along with Ivanov) as co-founder in January 2008 of the private limited company Fabergé Museum GmbH, which owns the museum in Baden-Baden. Around 40% of the 91 Fabergé items exhibited were fake, in the opinion of the above-mentioned art dealer.

Following the Hermitage scandal, a research article published in February 2021 by the BBC revealed, amongst other information, that in the late 1990s, Ivanov was allowed to study and photograph Fabergé pieces kept in the Fersman Mineralogical Museum in Moscow.

Shortly thereafter, Ivanov's collection appeared to have objects that were similar to those in the Fersman Museum. He claimed that he owned the originals, but the Kremlin Museums confirmed that the genuines recognized by experts were in the Fersman Museum. However, pieces very similar to those in the Fersman were exhibited in the Hermitage as real, like a carved stone figurine called Soldier of the Reserves (1915). The chief curator of the Fersman, Mikhail Generalov, told the BBC that he considered this figurine a copy made "so shamefully that it's a shame for Fabergé." He also stated that the museum had sent a letter to the Hermitage outlining its concerns and position regarding the originality of this item, but did not receive a substantive response.

In that letter addressed to Piotrovsky, the director of the Fersman Museum, Pavel Plechov, commented:

We also note that items from the Russian National Museum and Fabergé Museum in Baden-Baden – based on Fabergé works in the Mineralogical Museum – have featured regularly in exhibitions over the last twenty years. Notably Ice Carrier and the Constellation Imperial Easter Egg. These items have been appearing in exhibitions since Alexander Ivanov (founder of the Russian National Museum) received permission to photograph Fabergé items and other materials in the Mineralogical Museum in 1999, ostensibly to help illustrate his book Unknown Fabergé (published in 2002).

Several of the pieces in the controversial Hermitage exhibition had previously been shown at the New Jerusalem State Museum of History and Art in Istra, near Moscow, from 15 December 2018 to 24 March 2019.

Regarding Ivanov's hardstone animals on display at his private museum in Germany, the art dealer who publicly denounced the scandalous Hermitage exhibition commented in an article:

I was contacted some years ago by Evgeny Belousov, who used to work for the stonecutting workshop opened by Alexander Leventhal in St Petersburg in 2002. The workshop's leading client, recalls Belousov, was Alexander Ivanov – owner of the so-called 'Fabergé Museum' in Baden-Baden, where forgeries are two-a-pfennig. Ivanov, asserts Belousov, 'basically kept the workshop going. What struck me was how all his orders were based on Fabergé. Sometimes I had to copy works straight from museum catalogues. There were also customized sculptures. I saw items we had supplied to Ivanov appearing in books, having somehow become antiques. Elephants were made in huge quantities, of different sizes and from different stones. One day Ivanov placed an order for over 100 elephants! We couldn't handle the entire order ourselves so we had to use other stone-cutters as well. Every month these elephants were taken to Moscow in buckets; there wasn't even time to pack them. I can't give the exact number of items handled by Leventhal's workshop, but I reckon there were at least 200.' Ivanov did not seem to be putting these works up for sale, thought Belousov – 'at least not publicly… all the items quietly found their way into his private museum.'

=== Other names ===
Oher well-known names include Naum Nicolaevsky, his brother-in-law Vasily Konovalenko and Edward Singer. Starting in the 1960s in Russia (during the Soviet era), they specialised in the sale of genuine enameled items, from which they removed old marks and replaced them with those of Fabergé, but their greatest success was the carved stone figurines of people and animals, which found their way onto the Western market.

Other Russian stone-cutters include Mikhail Monastyrsky, Yuri Toptunov and Alexander Solomonovich Leventhal, to name a few.

== See also ==
- Freddy Novelo
- Tatiana Fabergé
- Victor Hammer
