= Rothschild (Fabergé egg) =

1902 Fabergé egg

Rothschild Fabergé egg
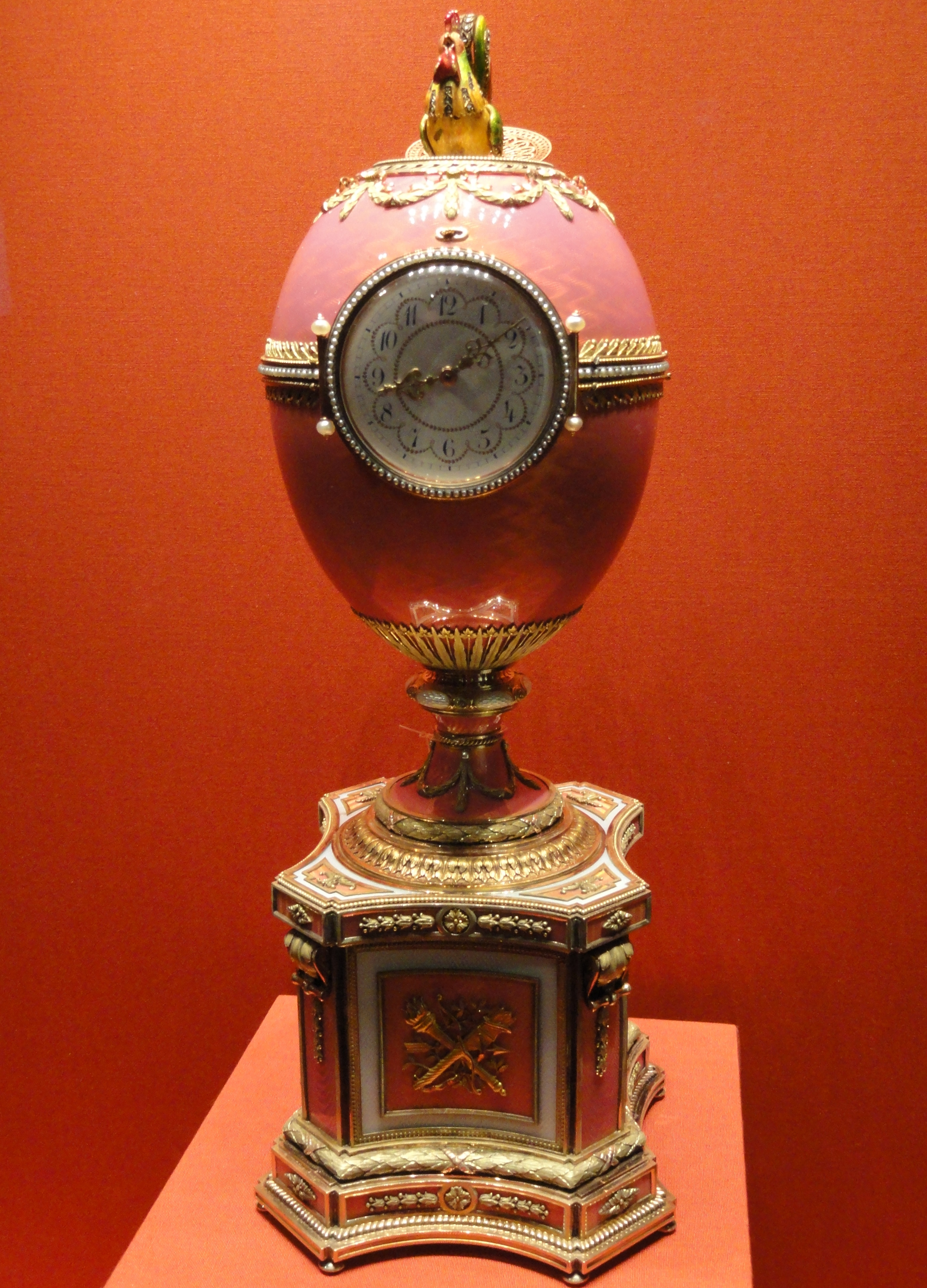
- Year delivered: 1902
- Customer: Béatrice Ephrussi de Rothschild
- Recipient: Germaine Halphen

Current owner
- Individual or institution: Hermitage Museum
- Year of acquisition: 2014

Design and materials
- Workmaster: Michael Perchin
- Surprise: a diamond-set cockerel pops up from the top of the egg

The Rothschild egg is a jewelled, enameled, decorated egg that was made under the supervision of the Russian jeweller Peter Carl Fabergé by the workshop of Michael Perchin in 1902. Béatrice Ephrussi de Rothschild presented this egg to Germaine Halphen upon her engagement to Béatrice's younger brother, Édouard Alphonse James de Rothschild.

== Surprise ==
Upon the hour, a diamond-set cockerel pops up from the top of the egg, flaps its wings four times, then nods his head three times, crowing all the while. This lasts for fifteen seconds, before the clock strikes the hour on a bell.

== Similarities with Kelch Chanticleer egg ==
As one of only four Fabergé eggs with an ornamentation surprise and a clock, similarities have been drawn with the 1904 Kelch Chanticleer egg.

== History ==
It is one of the few significant Fabergé eggs that were not made for the Russian Imperial family, and it had been in the Rothschild family since it was first purchased. It was one of the most expensive eggs that Fabergé had ever made and sold.

=== Sale in 2007 ===
It was sold by Christie's auction house on 28 November 2007, for £8.9 million (including commission). The price achieved by the egg set three auction records: it is the most expensive timepiece, Russian object, and Fabergé object ever sold at auction, surpassing the $9.6 million sale of the 1913 Winter egg in 2002.

The egg was bought by Alexander Ivanov, the director of the Russian National Museum. "It's one of the most beautiful, valuable and most intricate Fabergé eggs ever," Ivanov said, as well as adding that "We didn't have investors, and this egg will go into the private museum which we are building in downtown Moscow. We will not resell it." The Rothschild egg was eventually displayed at Ivanov's Fabergé Museum in Baden-Baden, Germany.

=== Subsequent history ===
On 8 December 2014, the Rothschild egg was given to the Hermitage Museum in Saint Petersburg, Russia. This occurred during a reception to commemorate the 250th anniversary of the museum. The presentation of the egg was made by Vladimir Putin, the President of Russia, who also gave another item by Fabergé to the museum. In a speech during the reception, Putin made the following remarks: "I would like to present a gift to the Hermitage: a clock created by Carl Faberge, and a clock-egg, another of Carl Faberge’s works. The first is a clock created for the 25th anniversary of the marriage between Emperor Alexander III and Empress Maria Feodorovna. The second is called the Rothschild-Faberge-Clock-Egg. I hope they will find a place in the Hermitage’s displays." As of January 2019, the Rothschild egg is on display in Room 302 of the Hermitage's General Staff Building.

It has been reported that Ivanov donated the egg to the Russian government in 2014. On 1 December 2014, British and German tax investigators had conducted a search of Ivanov's Fabergé Museum in Baden-Baden. It appears that this raid was connected to a tax dispute involving the Rothschild egg.
