= Copying =

Duplication of information or an artifact

Copying is the duplication of information or an artifact based on an instance of that information or artifact, and not using the process that originally generated it. With analog forms of information, copying is only possible to a limited degree of accuracy, which depends on the quality of the equipment used and the skill of the operator. There is some inevitable generation loss, deterioration and accumulation of "noise" (random small changes) from original to copy when copies are made. This deterioration accumulates with each generation. With digital forms of information, copying is perfect. Copy and paste is frequently used by a computer user when they select and copy an area of text or content.

== In art ==
In visual art, copying the works of the masters is a standard way that students learn to paint and sculpt. Often, artists will use the term after to credit the original artist in the title of the copy (regardless of how similar the two works appear) such as in Vincent van Gogh's "First Steps (after Millet)" and Pablo Picasso's "Luncheon on the Grass, after Manet" (based on Manet's well-known work). In sculpture, copies have often been made using devices such as the pointing machine, the pantograph or, more recently, computer guided router systems that scan a model and can produce it in a variety of materials and in any desired size. Another way of copying three-dimensional works is by lost-wax casting and other forms of molding and casting.

== In literature ==
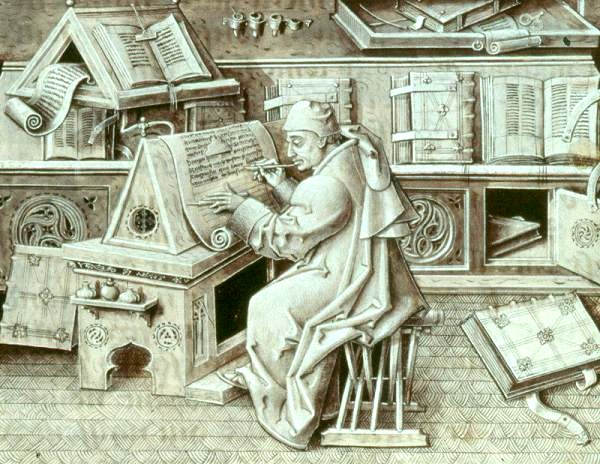
Portrait of Burgundian scribe Jean Miélot who was a copyist.

Prior to the invention of the printing press, the only way to obtain a copy of a book was to copy it out by hand (see scrivener). Throughout the Middle Ages, monks copied entire texts as a way of disseminating and preserving literary, philosophical and religious texts.

== In office work ==
Offices need more than one copy of a document in a number of situations. They usually need a copy of outgoing correspondence for their records. Sometimes they want to circulate copies of documents they create to several interested parties.

Until the late 18th century, if an office wanted to keep a copy of an outgoing letter, a clerk had to write out the copy by hand. This technology continued to be prevalent through most of the 19th century. For these purposes, offices employed copy clerks, also known as copyists, scribes, and scriveners.

A few alternatives to hand copying were invented between the mid-17th century and the late 18th century, but none had a significant impact on offices. In 1780 James Watt obtained a patent for letter copying presses, which James Watt & Co. produced beginning in that year. Letter copying presses were used by the early 1780s by people like Benjamin Franklin, George Washington, and Thomas Jefferson. In 1785, Jefferson was using both stationary and portable presses made by James Watt & Co.

During the 19th century, a host of competing technologies were introduced to meet office copying needs. The technologies that were most commonly used in 1895 are identified in an 1895 description of the New York Business College's course program: "All important letters or documents are copied in a letter-book or carbon copies [are] made, and instruction is also given in the use of the mimeograph and other labor-saving office devices."

== Biological copying ==
Organically, copying of genetic information can take place using DNA replication, which is able to copy and replicate the data with a high degree of accuracy, but mistakes are common, and occur in the form of mutations. However, in the process of DNA repair, many of the mistakes are corrected by checking the copied data against the original data.

== Digital copying ==
The same principle is applied digitally, in devices such as in hard disks, but in a different form. The magnetised data on the disk consists of 1s and 0s. Unlike DNA, it only has two types of information, rather than four types, however, it still has a polar concept of transfer. In this case, the read-write head acts as an intermediary. A data section reading "1", can only trigger one type of response, and "0" for the other. These responses from reading are converted into an electrical form that gets carried through the circuits. Although this can be later converted and processed for other ways of using the data, which can be modified, if a file was being copied from one hard disk to another, the principle ensures that the data is transferred with high fidelity, because only each type of signal can only trigger one type of data write, in this case, a 1 or a 0. This excludes exceptions where the data was written incorrectly or the existing data has been corrupted while on the disk such that no distinction can be made, but usually the hard disk returns the area as unreadable. The other concept that using digital copying is website copy, digital copying has more interpretation than just the basic concept of disk read and write itself. Digital Copy is a sample of interpretation of digital copying.

== Copying rights ==
A video regarding the ethics of copying in favour of being able to copy

The concept of copying has a particular significance in certain areas of law. In each of the primary areas of intellectual property law, a number of cases have refined the question of what exactly constitutes the kind of copying prohibited by law, especially in areas such as copyright law.

A related concept is plagiarism, copying others' work and passing it off as one's own. Many schools will take plagiarism to academic suspension, or even the failure of a course.

== See also ==
- Copier
- Copyscript
- Duplicating machines
- Fauxbergé
- Replica
- Typescript
