= Alexander Ivanov (art collector) =

Russian art collector (born 1962)

- Александр Иванов
- Born: October 27, 1962 (age 63); Ostrov, Pskov, Russian SFSR, USSR
- Occupations: Businessman, art collector, owner of Faberge Museum

Alexander Ivanov (Russian: Александр Иванов, born October 27, 1962) is a Russian art collector who lives in Moscow. He is best known for the Fabergé Museum in Baden-Baden, which is the first private Russian-owned museum outside of Russia. In the 2010s, he claimed that a Middle Eastern collector offered him $2 billion for his Fabergé collection, the world's largest collection in his own words. Other collecting interests include dinosaur fossils, ancient Greek and Roman art, pre-Columbian gold, Old Master paintings, Impressionist paintings, Orthodox icons, and vintage automobiles.

His most significant purchase was the 1902 Fabergé egg made as an engagement gift to Baron Édouard de Rothschild fiancée. The collector bought it at Christie's in London on 28 November 2007 for £8 million (£8,980,500 including buyer's premium), almost $16.5 million at the time, saying it was Fabergé’s "finest ever." The item broke three world records, a record auction price for any Russian object and both the world's most expensive timepiece and Fabergé object ever sold.

== Early life and career ==
Born in Pskov, Russian SFSR, in 1962, Ivanov served in the Soviet Navy before making his studies in Moscow, eventually graduating in Law from Moscow State University. In the late 1980s, as the Soviet Union began to allow some capitalism, Ivanov was one of the first Russian businessmen to start trading in computers, and he quickly built up a successful and lucrative business. He began collecting Fabergé eggs and other art soon afterwards, because he had bags full of cash that he didn't know what to do with.

== Activities as art collector ==
=== Fabergé Museum ===
In May 2009 Ivanov opened the Fabergé Museum in the German spa city of Baden-Baden. He said his museum building cost about 17 million euros to buy and renovate, including a 1 million euro security system. He chose Baden-Baden, near Germany's western border, because it's "close to France, a resort for the rich, and historically it has always been the most popular resort for Russians." He stated that the local government had been supportive.

Peter Carl Fabergé was official supplier to the Russian Imperial court from 1885 to 1917. It also catered to the growing demand for luxury items from the Russian Empire's newly rich as the economy boomed in the two decades before World War I. In addition to Easter eggs, Fabergé made a wide range of jewelry and decorative artworks, such as figurines of people, animals, vases with flowers, etc. The company had international brand recognition, with a shop in London, and among its international customers were the Queen of the United Kingdom, and the King of Siam (now Thailand). After 1917 Bolshevik revolutionaries began to sell off Imperial treasures, and Fabergé's artworks became popular with American collectors, such as Lillian Thomas Pratt, Matilda Geddings Gray, Marjorie Merriweather Post, India Early Minshall, Malcolm Forbes, etc. When Russian billionaires appeared on the market in the early 2000s, prices soared to record levels.

The collector said another reason why he opened the museum in Germany was security. He told Britain's The Independent newspaper: "It's very difficult [in Russia] because of all the administrative barriers. You have to be indebted to someone, and you can never feel that your collection is safe – not from the state, not from bandits, not from anyone. In Germany we spend serious money on security of course, but at least you know that the state itself won't do anything."

In April 2009, just a month before the opening of the Fabergé Museum, a company called Fabergé Ltd., registered in the Cayman Islands, filed a lawsuit against the Fabergé Museum claiming it owned the rights to all things named "Fabergé". However, in January 2010, a German court upheld the Fabergé Museum's right to use its name.

=== Tax investigation and the Rothschild Egg ===
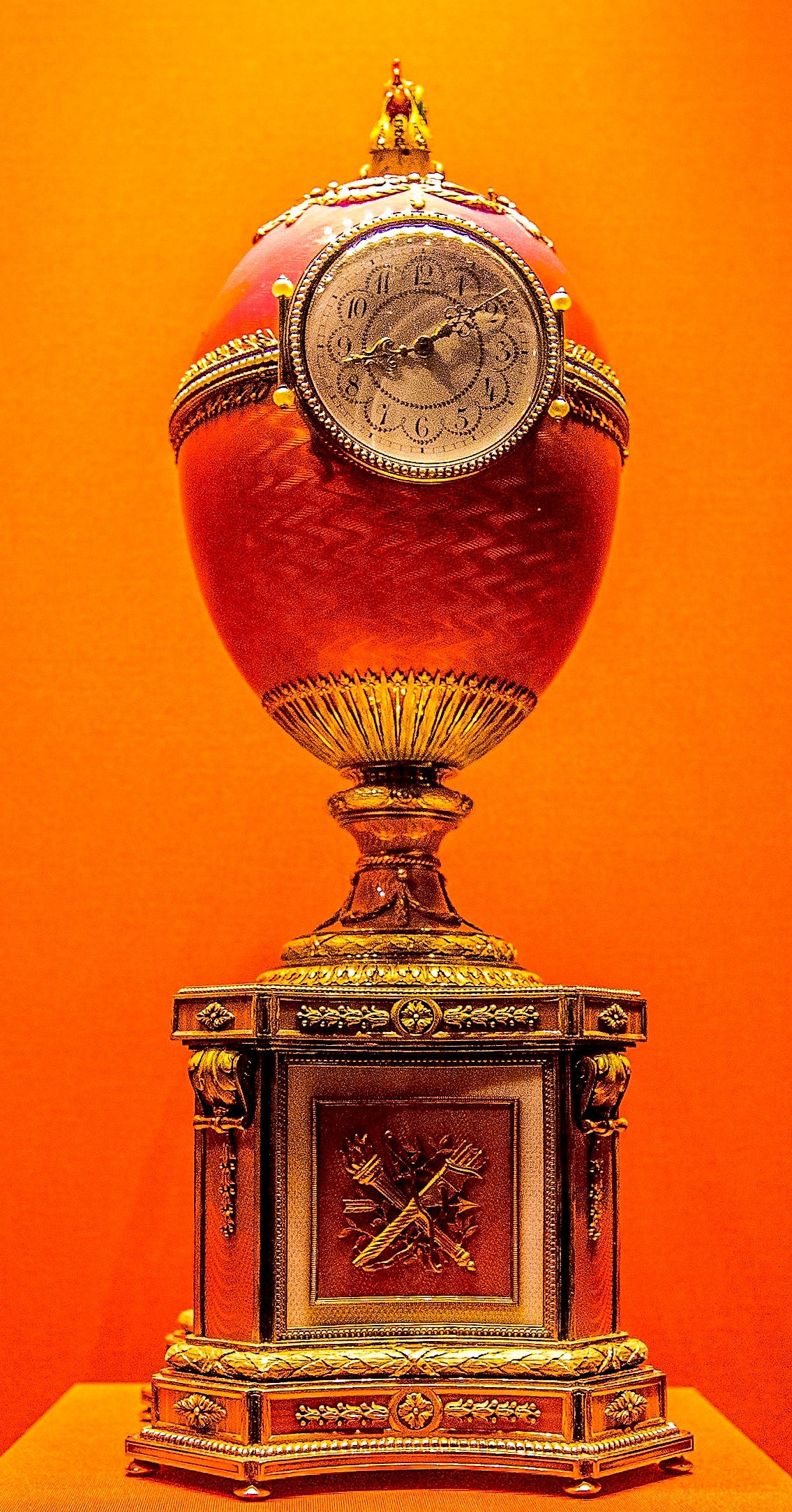
The Rothschild Egg photographed in the Hermitage

On 8 December 2014, Russia's President Vladimir Putin gifted the Rothschild Egg to the State Hermitage Museum on occasion of its 250th anniversary. Days before this gift was made, on 1 December, around 40 British law-enforcement officers raided the museum, as well as the private home and vehicle of the museum's director. Ivanov said that the officers' actions were politically motivated, coming amid tensions between the West and Russia, and hoping to ruin the gift ceremony and embarrass Russia's head of state.

Actually, British investigators at the behest of UK's HM Revenue and Customs department, claimed that the museum had failed to pay nearly £70,000 in VAT on objects bought over the past 15 years in London auction houses. The raids were carried out with support from Germany's Financial Investigation and Customs Department. The museum denied the charges and declared that nothing incriminating was found during the operation. The charges originated in February 2012, when the museum's director, Sergei Avtonoshkin, missed a flight to Moscow departing from London, where he had purchased a number of items at Christie's and Bonhams. When he tried to buy a ticket for another flight, Heathrow's custom agents stopped him for questioning. Agents seized nearly 60 items and grew suspicious that the museum might have other items that had violated VAT regulation.

Regarding the Rothschild Egg, when Ivanov bought the egg in London in 2007 he claimed a VAT refund of approximately £600,000 because he had the egg shipped to Russia, which exempted the purchase from EU tax, but investigators suspected it had been first transported to Germany. When investigators raided the museum, Avtonoshkin told them that the egg had been loaned to Baden-Baden briefly for an exhibition and then sent back to Moscow.

The egg was part of the Fabergé Museum collection and was on show during its opening ceremony on 9 May 2009, as reported by the Russian TV channel NTV: "the pearl of the collection is the Rothschild egg".

The Rothschild Egg record in the Hermitage website says: "Entered in 2015. Gift of the President of the Russian Federation V. V. Putin through the donor A. N. Ivanov".

According to the so-called Russian anticorruption project "Municipal Scanner", Ivanov made his most expensive purchases after he partnered with Konstantin Goloshchapov, a well known figure in the political and business circles of St. Petersburg whom the Russian media consider an acquaintance and even a close friend of Putin. Deducing that it was with Goloshchapov's money that this egg was actually purchased. Ivanov and Goloshchapov partnership began at least from 2003, when they co-founded AllianceInvest. Both also co-founded in January 2008 the private limited company Fabergé Museum GmbH, which owns the museum in Baden-Baden. In the Hermitage website Goloshchapov also appears as the donor of another piece by Fabergé, the Alexander III 25th Wedding Anniversary mantel clock, which was also presented by Putin in December 2014.

== Fauxbergé and the Hermitage scandal ==
In January 2021, an art dealer claimed in an open letter to the director of the Hermitage Museum Mikhail Piotrovsky that a number of fakes (so-called Fauxbergé), including five eggs, were on show at the exhibition “Fabergé: Jeweller to the Imperial Court” (25 November 2020 – 14 March 2021). The international press reported the scandal.

In the research article in Russian "Роковые яйца. История скандальной выставки Фаберже в Эрмитаже и тех, кто за ней стоит" (Fatal Eggs. The Story of the Scandalous Fabergé Exhibition and Those behind it) published in February 2021 by the BBC, it was reported about the activities and connections of the two partners of the exhibition, as well as on a few of the counterfeits exhibited and the Hermitage's involvement.

The Hermitage's partners in the exhibition were the so-called Russian National Museum and the Museum of Christian Culture. Under the first name was Ivanov's legal entity, which has no premises, under the second, a museum patronized by Konstantin Goloshchapov. It was from these two interrelated collectors that a number of exhibits were loaned, the authenticity of some which leading Fabergé experts doubted.

No fewer than 65 of the 91 Fabergé exhibits originated from the following museums: the Fabergé Museum in Baden-Baden (46 items), the Russian National Museum in Moscow (11) and the Museum of Christian Culture in St Petersburg (8). Around 40% of the 91 Fabergé items present in the exhibition were fake, in the opinion of the above-mentioned art dealer.

The BBC sent questions to the Hermitage about the criteria for cooperation with private museums, but they, like other questions, remained unanswered. Piotrovsky, through the press service, declined to talk to a BBC correspondent. Museum staff, who spoke to the BBC on condition of anonymity, expressed bewilderment at the partnership and exhibition, but added that they preferred not to get involved in this matter. Some of them mentioned fear.

On the website of the Hermitage museum, Ivanov was presented as "a professor", "a member of the UNESCO Special Commission for the Preservation of the World Cultural Heritage", and "expert of the Ministry of Culture of the Russian Federation." UNESCO responded to a request from the BBC that Ivanov was not an expert of that commission. The Ministry of Culture pointed to the list of certified experts, Ivanov was not in it. In an interview with the BBC, Ivanov admitted that he was neither an expert of the Ministry of Culture, nor a member of the UNESCO commission, and stated that the Hermitage presented him this way, and he presented himself only as an "expert on Fabergé". He insisted that he was an "honorary professor", but could not specify either the subject or the educational institution, avoiding answering several times. The press service of the Hermitage said that the biography details were provided by Ivanov himself.
