= Fabergé Museum =

Museum in Baden-Württemberg, Germany

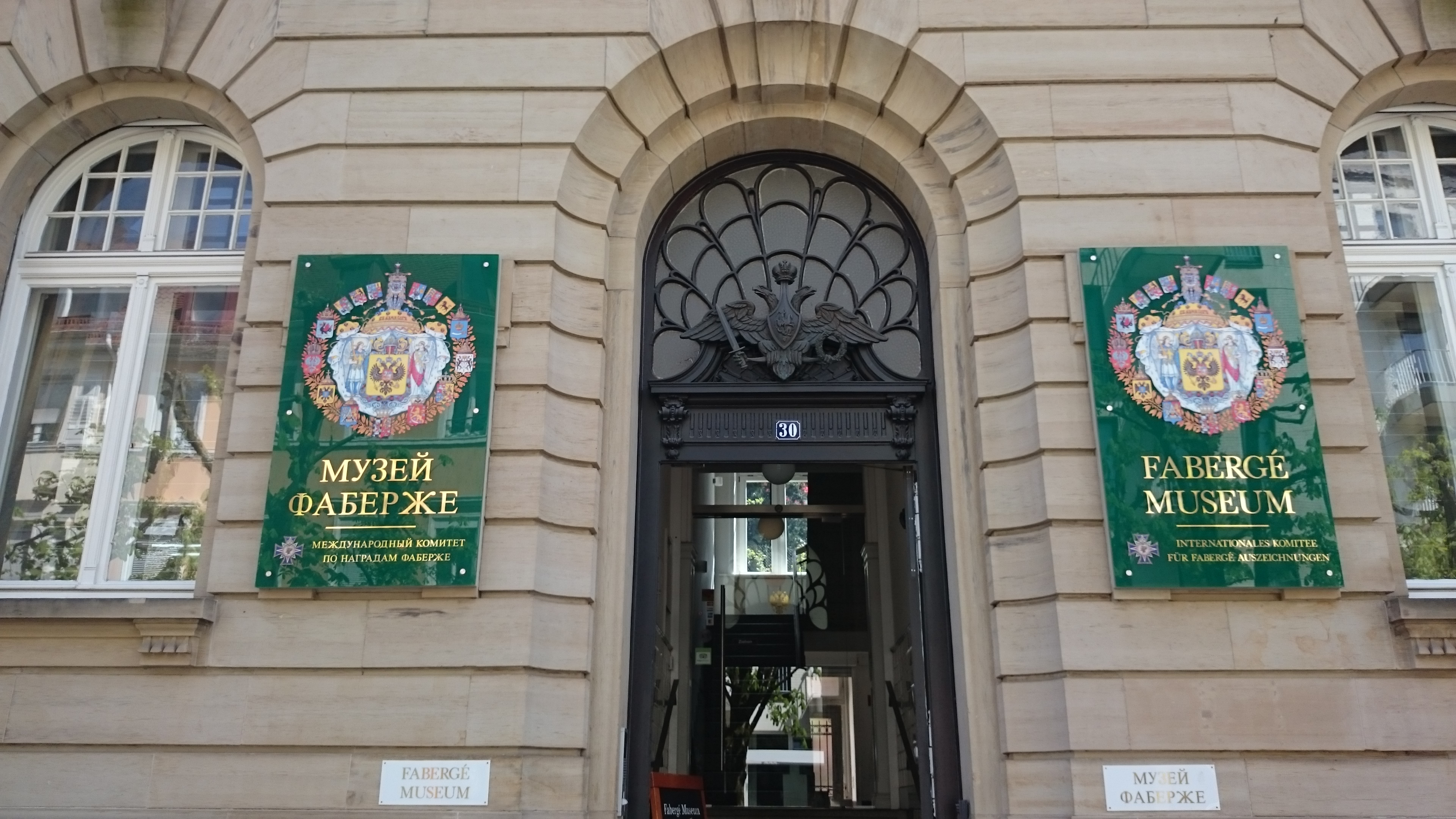

- Fabergé Museum in Baden-Baden Fabergé Museum (Germany)
- Established: 15 May 2009
- Location: Baden-Baden, Germany
- Coordinates: 48°45′43″N 8°14′35″E
- Collection size: over 1,500 items
- Founder: Alexander Ivanov
- Website: www.faberge-museum.de

The Fabergé Museum is a privately owned museum located in the German spa city of Baden-Baden exhibiting different collections, among them, items made by the Russian jewellery firm Fabergé, as well as Fauxbergé pieces. It was opened by Russian art collector Alexander Ivanov on 9 May 2009. It is owned by the private limited company Fabergé Museum GmbH, which was originally co-founded by Alexander Ivanov and Konstantin Goloshchapov in January 2008.

== Description ==
The museum's collection contains different items, made by Fabergé, but also a number of Fauxbergé pieces, including several eggs, as denounced by several Fabergé experts on occasion of an exhibition held in the Hermitage Museum in 2020–2021.

Ivanov said his museum building cost about 17 million euros to buy and renovate, including a 1 million euro security system. He chose Baden-Baden, near Germany's western border, because it is "quiet and nice, middle in Europe, close to France and Switzerland, a resort for the rich, and historically it has always been the most popular resort for Russians."

Ivanov said that one reason that he opened the museum in Germany was due to safety concerns. He told Britain's Independent newspaper: "It's very difficult [in Russia] because of all the administrative barriers [...] You have to be indebted to someone, and you can never feel that your collection is safe – not from the state, not from bandits, not from anyone. In Germany we spend serious money on security of course, but at least you know that the state itself won't do anything."

The museum's first year was marked by a bitter court conflict. In April 2009, just a month before the official opening, a company calling itself Faberge Ltd. that is registered in the Cayman Islands and owned by the Gilbertson family of South Africa filed a lawsuit over rights to the Fabergé trademark. This made the Fabergé museum's first year a difficult one. While the case was pending, the museum couldn't use the Fabergé name, which meant no advertising or even a sign on the door. In January 2010, a German court ruled in favor of the Fabergé Museum, and it immediately began to resume functioning with full right to use the Fabergé name.

In May 2012, the Fabergé Museum opened a new permanent exhibition titled Gold of the World. It consists of just over 100 gold items from various civilizations and continents that date from the 6th century BC up until the mid-20th century. Among the items are an ancient Iranian chalice, ancient Greek jewelry, Fabergé cigarette cases, Aztec and Inca gold jewelry, and a very rare 18th-century British gold trophy.

== Rothschild Fabergé egg ==
The most significant item in the museum's collection was the Rothschild Fabergé egg, which was made as an engagement gift from Béatrice Ephrussi de Rothschild to her brother's fiancée. Ivanov bought it at Christie's auction house in London on 28 November 2007, for £8 million (£8,980,500 including buyer's premium), almost $16.5 million at the time.

On 8 December 2014, Russia's President Vladimir Putin gifted the Rothschild Fabergé egg to the Hermitage Museum on occasion of its 250th anniversary. Days before this gift was made, German customs officers, accompanied by British counterparts, raided the Fabergé Museum. Ivanov said that the officers' actions and its timing was politically motivated, coming amid tensions between the West and Russia, and hoping to ruin the publicly announced Hermitage gift ceremony and embarrass Russia's head of state. In reply, British investigators at the behest of UK's HM Revenue and Customs department, claimed that the museum had failed to pay nearly £70,000 in Value Added Tax (VAT) on artifacts purchased over the past 15 years at major auction houses in London. The raids were carried out with support from Germany's Financial Investigation and Customs Department. The museum denied the charges and declared that nothing incriminating was found during the operation.

About the Rothschild Egg, when Ivanov bought the egg in London in 2007 he claimed a VAT refund of approximately £600,000 because he had the egg shipped to Russia, which exempted the purchase from EU tax, but investigators suspected it had been first transported to Germany. When investigators raided the museum, its director told them that the egg had been loaned to Baden-Baden briefly for an exhibition and then sent back to Moscow.

== Scandal in the Hermitage ==
In January 2021, an art dealer specialized in Fabergé claimed in an open letter to the Hermitage Museum Mikhail Piotrovsky that a number of items (including five eggs) on display at the exhibition "Fabergé: Jeweller to the Imperial Court" (25 November 2020 – 14 March 2021), were fakes (so-called Fauxbergé). The scandal was echoed by the international press.

Fabergé scholar Geza von Habsburg told the BBC regarding this issue: "Judging by the photographs and descriptions published online, all of the so-called 're-found Fabergé Imperial Easter Eggs' from the museum in Baden-Baden displayed in this exhibition are fakes, in my opinion." Other leading Fabergé experts such as Alexander von Solodkoff and Ulla Tillander-Godenhielm also doubted its authenticity.

At least 46 of the 91 items displayed in the Hermitage temporary exhibition came from the Fabergé Museum in Baden-Baden. According to the art dealer who uncovered the scandal, around 40% of 91 Fabergé items exhibited were counterfeits.

== See also ==
- Fabergé Museum in Saint Petersburg, Russia
- Fauxbergé
