= Freddy Novelo =

Alfredo Novelo, better known as Freddy Novelo (February 29, 1960 – May 29, 2013 in Merida, Mexico) was an art collector.

He was presented as the youngest Fabergé collector in the world and owner of the largest Russian Imperial collection (1613–1918) in Latin America and one of the 10 most important Fabergé collections in the world.

== Fauxbergé, frauds and fakes ==
He claimed that his collection of works of art, jewels and documents had been inherited from his friend Charles Rockefeller in 1992 and most of them belonged to the Romanov family. He was reported for fraud in Acapulco.

A museum keeper denied the story that he had inherited this collection from Charles Rockefeller, whom according to Novelo had met in Paris at university while studying history of art and died in his arms, as Novelo had no academic degrees.

One of the star pieces of his collection, the so-called "Huevo del invierno azul" (Blue Winter Egg) that he claimed was commissioned by tsar Nicholas II to Fabergé in 1913, was identified as a Fauxbergé, a fake.
