= Fersman Mineralogical Museum =

Museum in Moscow, Russia

Coordinates: 55°43′7″N 37°35′34″E

Fersman Mineralogical Museum (Russian: Минералогический музей им. А. Е. Ферсмана)
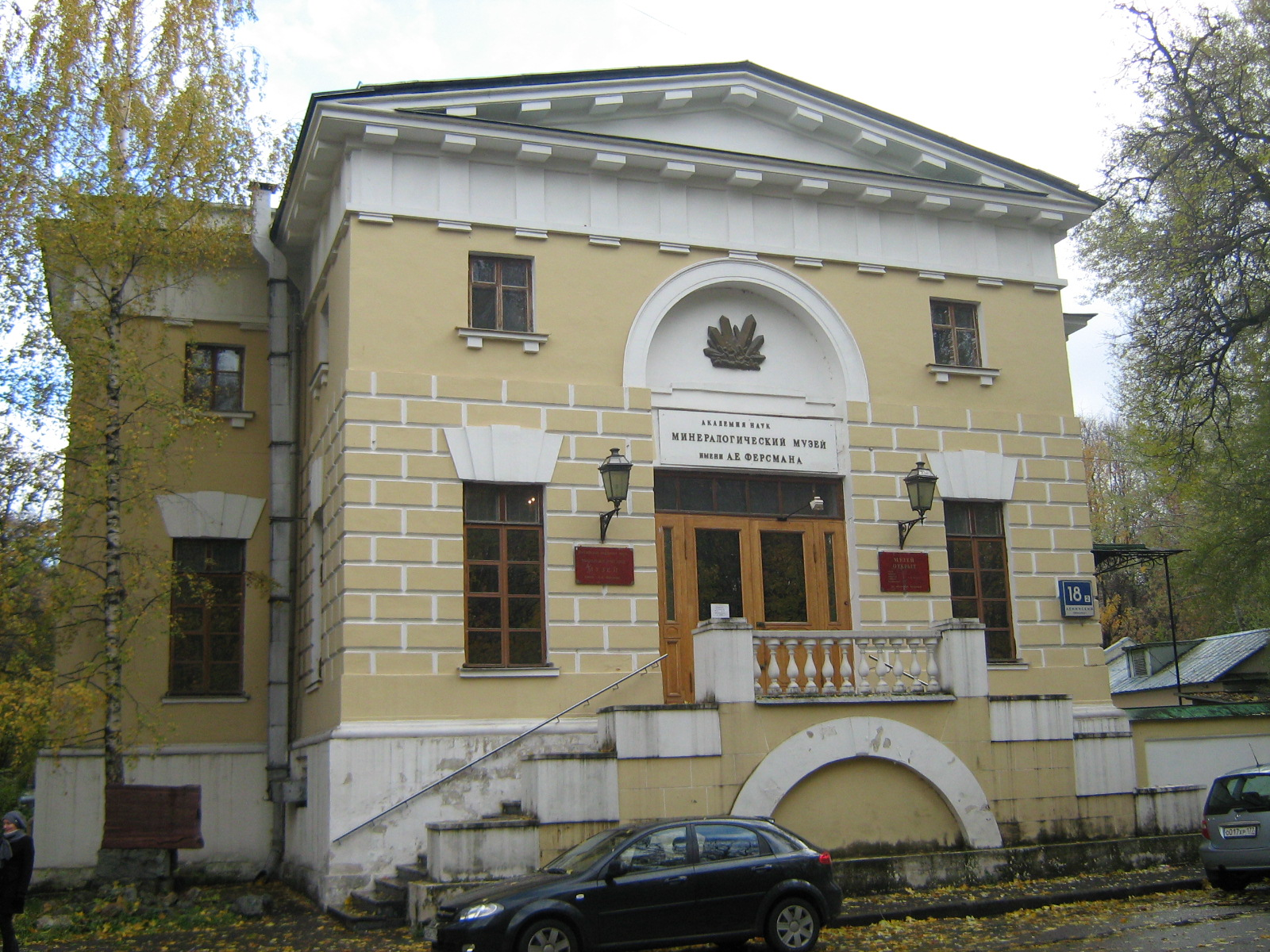
- Current headquarters of the Fersman Mineralogical Museum in Moscow

- Location within Moscow
- Established: 1716
- Location: Moscow, Russia.
- Collections: Systematic collection, Crystal collection, Locality collections, Pseudomorph collection and Gems and stone art collection
- Collection size: more than 135,000 items

Fersman Mineralogical Museum (Russian: Минералогический музей им. А. Е. Ферсмана) is one of the largest mineral museums of the world, located in Moscow, Russia. Its collections include more than 135,000 items. Among them natural crystals, geodes, druses and other kinds of mineral treasures. The museum was named after Alexander Fersman.

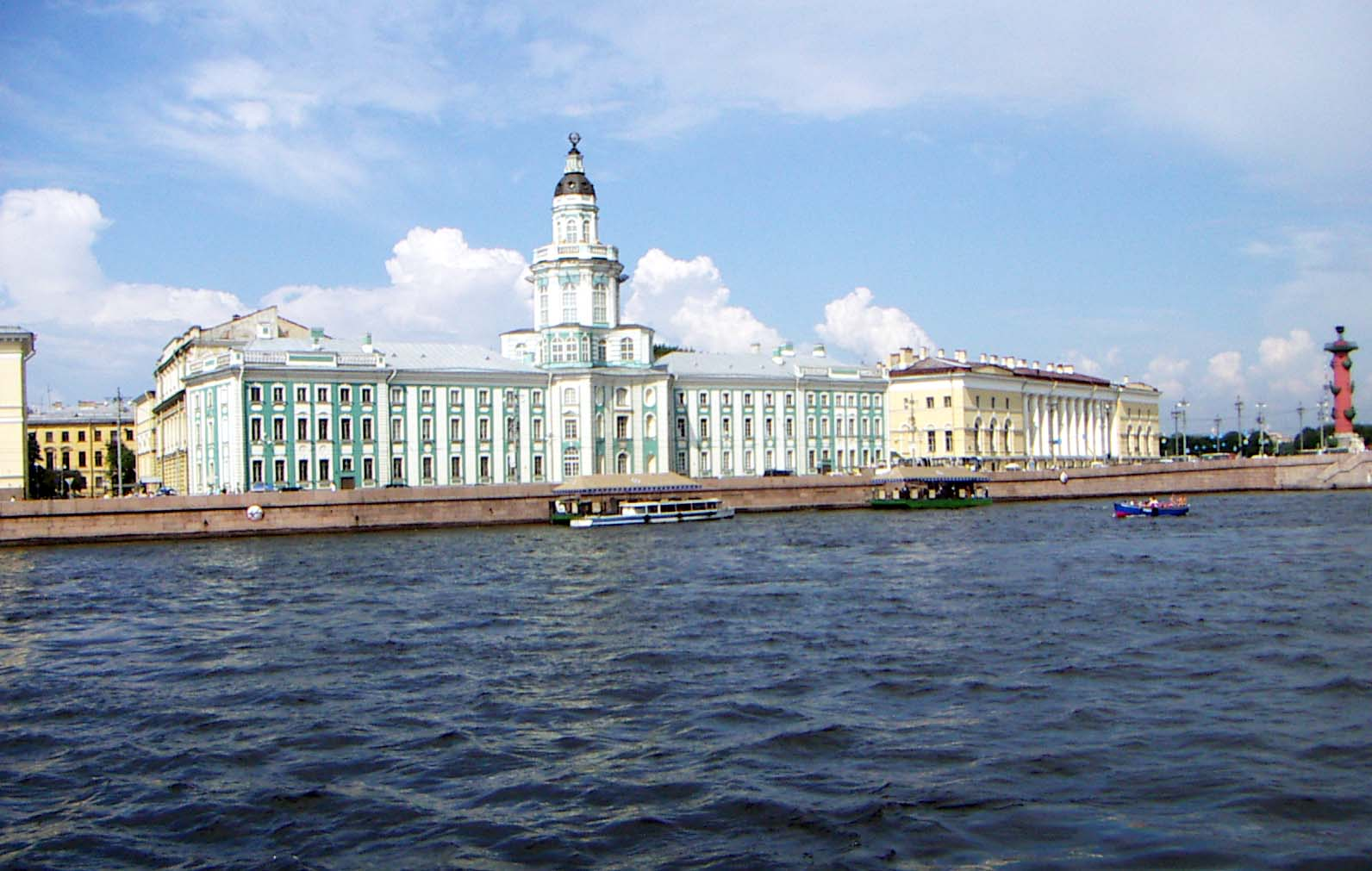
Original headquarters of the Fersman Mineralogical Museum - the Kunstkamera in Saint Petersburg.

== History ==
=== Early history ===
The museum was founded in 1716 in Saint Petersburg.

On 5 December 1747 a great fire destroyed virtually the whole collection. In 1836 the Kunstkamera was divided into 7 separate museums, including Mineralogical museum which was moved to the new building. In 1898 the museum was expanded and renamed the Geological museum.

=== In Moscow ===
Museum was moved from Petersburg to Moscow in 1934 together with the Russian Academy of Sciences.

== Collections ==
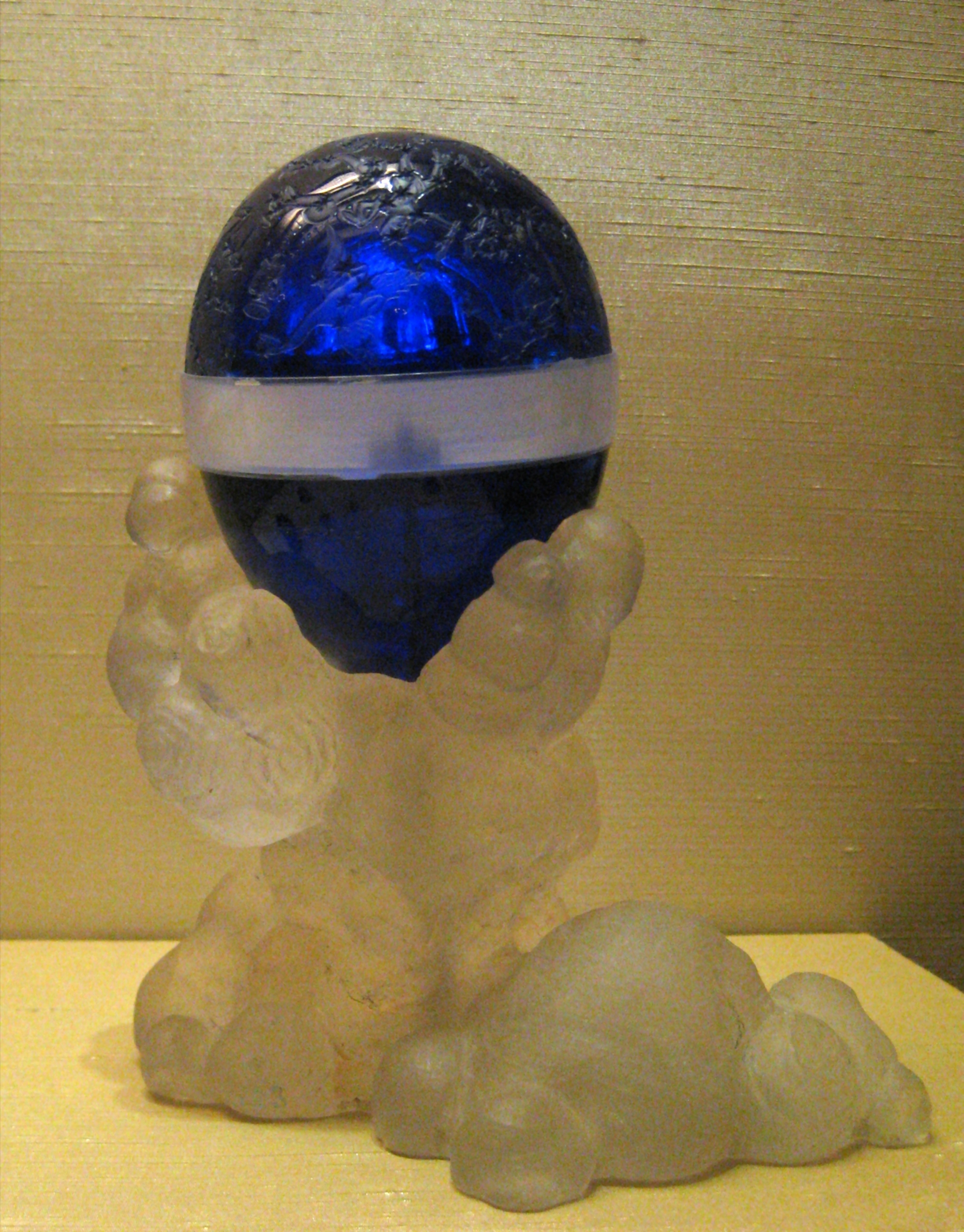
Constellation egg, an unfinished Fabergé egg in the museum's collection.

All museum acquisitions since 1716 were divided at the beginning of 20th century by the academician Vladimir Vernadsky to 5 main collections:

- Systematic collection.
- Crystal collection.
- Locality collections.
- Pseudomorph collection.
- Gems and stone art collection.

== Directors ==
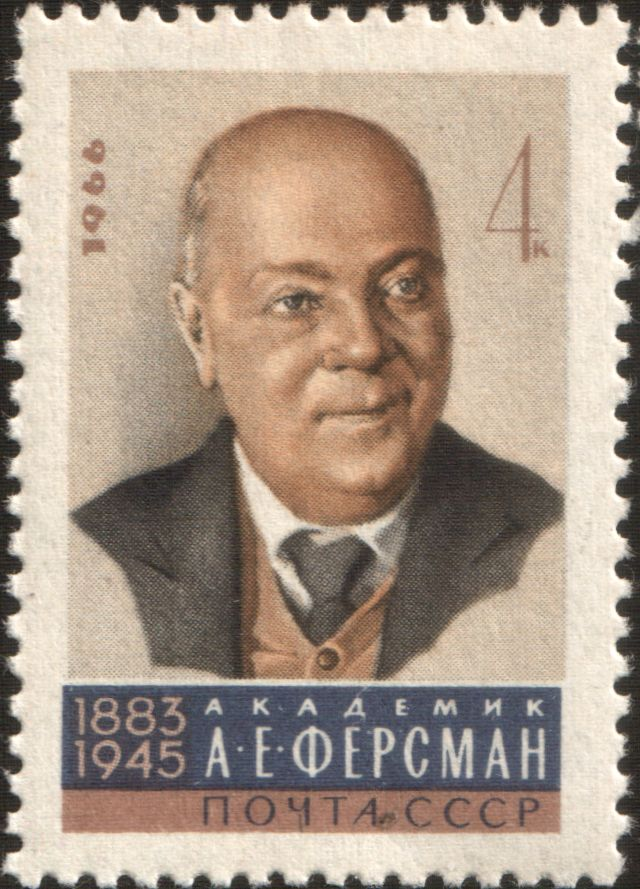
The museum is named after Alexander Fersman.

- 1835–1845 Grigori Gelmersen
- 1845–1857 Konstantin Grevingk
- 1857–1866 Adolf Gebel
- 1866–1873 Nikolai Koksharov
- 1873–1900 Fyodor Shmidt
- 1900–1906 Feodosy Chernyshov
- 1906–1919 Vladimir Vernadsky
- 1919–1945 Alexander Fersman
  - 1930–1945 Vladimir Kryzhanovsky (executive director)
- 1945–1945 Vladimir Kryzhanovsky
- 1947–1953 Dmitry S. Belyankin
- 1953–1976 Georgi Barsanov
- 1976–1980 Yuri Orlov
- 1980–1982 Vladimir Sobolev
- 1983–1995 Aleksandr Godovikov
- 1995–2010 Margarita Novgorodova
- 2011–2015 Viktor Garanin
- 2016–present Pavel Plechov
