= Counterfeit =

Making a copy or imitation which is represented as the original

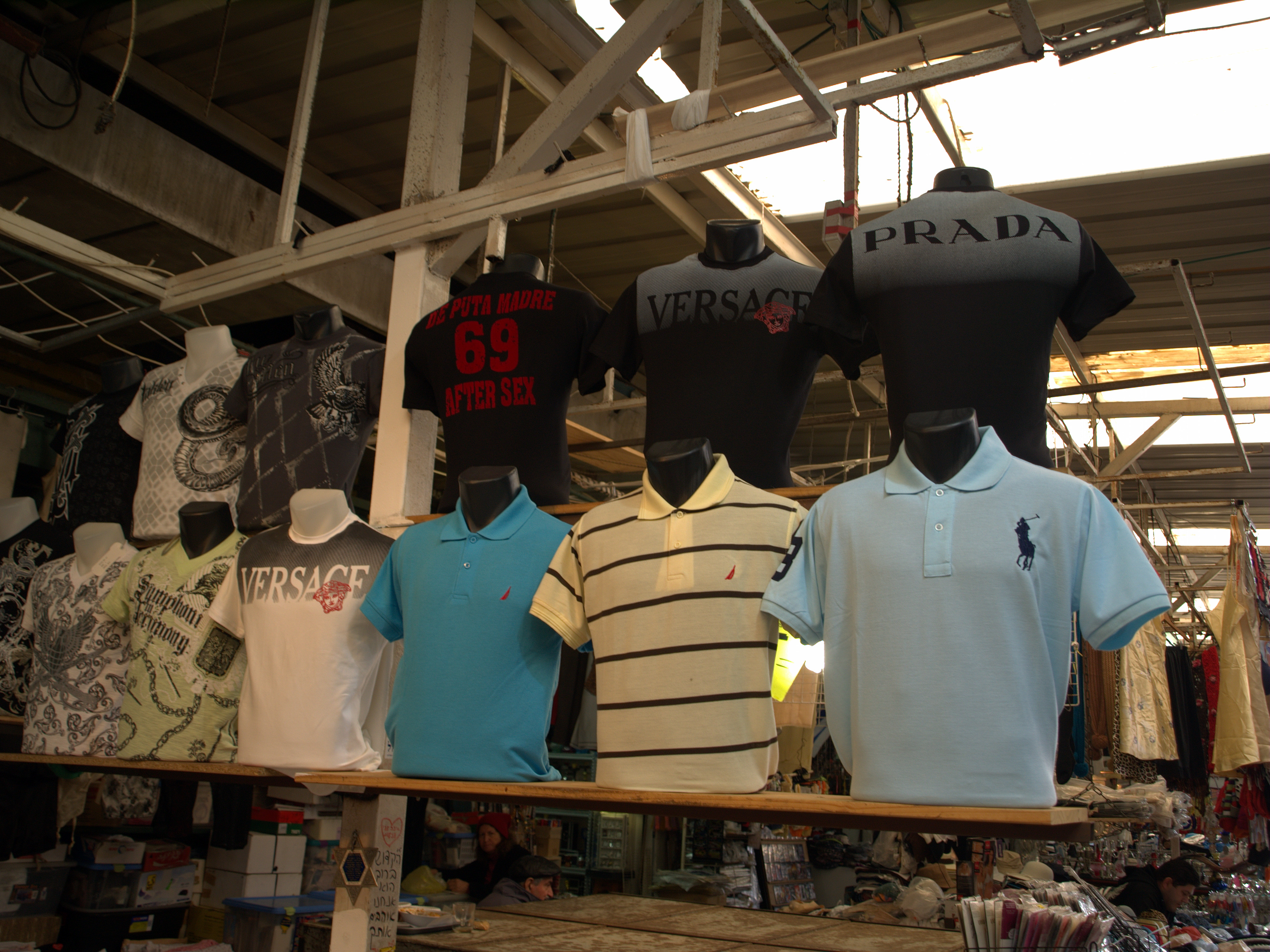
Counterfeit designer t-shirts at a flea market

A counterfeit is a fake or unauthorized replica of a genuine product, such as money, documents, designer items, or other valuable goods. Counterfeiting generally involves creating an imitation of a genuine item that closely resembles the original to deceive others into believing it is authentic.

Counterfeit products are often made to take advantage of the higher value of the original product, typically using lower-quality materials or production methods. Counterfeit food, drinks, medicines, and personal care products can contain harmful or inactive ingredients, causing anything from mild issues to serious, life-threatening ones. Counterfeit footwear, clothing, and accessories have been found to contain high levels of lead, arsenic, and phthalates.

== Forgery of money or government bonds ==
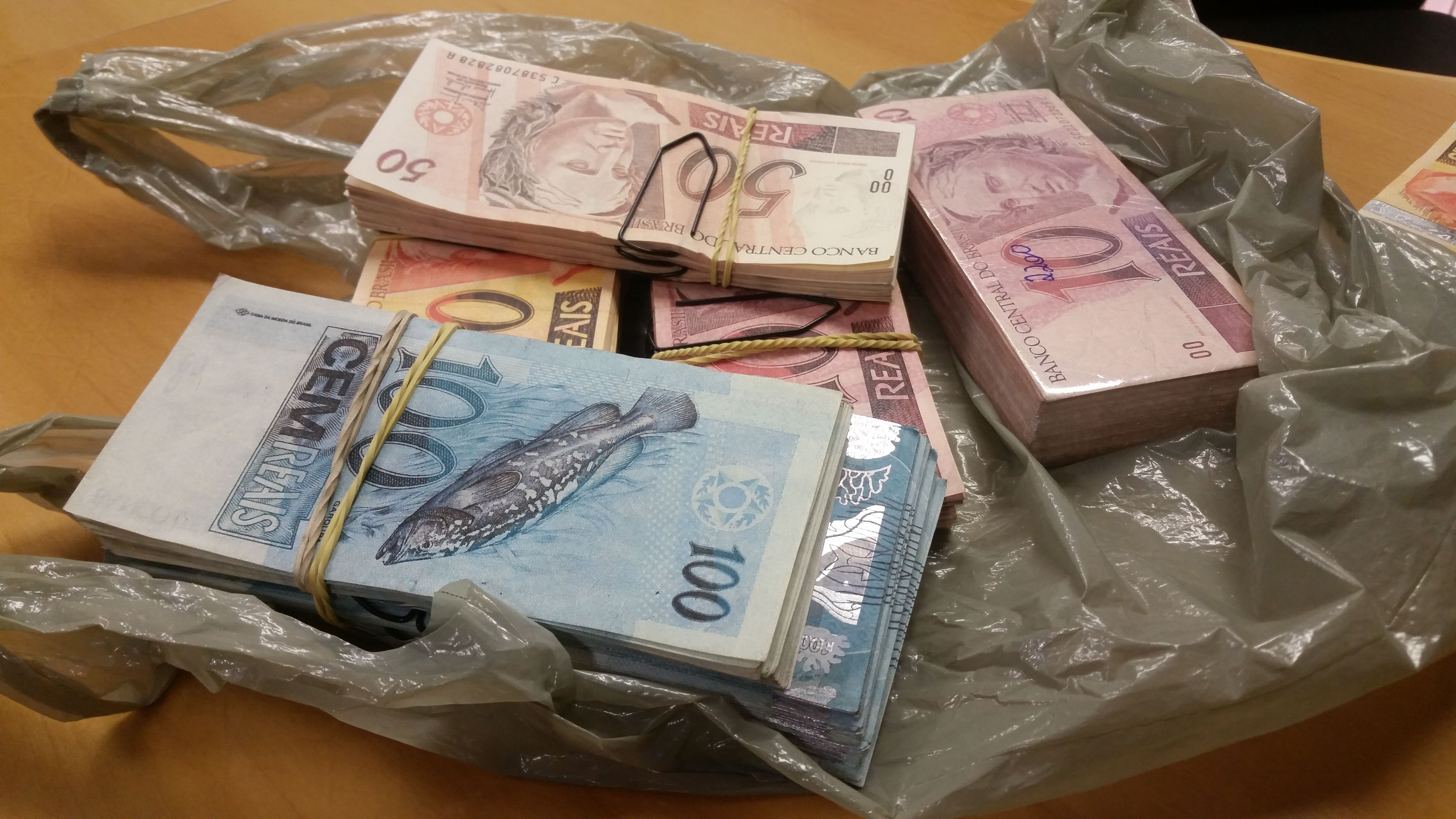
Counterfeit Brazilian real banknotes

Counterfeit money is currency that is produced without the legal sanction of the state or government; this is a crime in all jurisdictions of the world. The United States Secret Service, mostly known for its guarding-of-officials task, was initially organized primarily to combat the counterfeiting of U.S. dollars in the wake of the American Civil War. Both sides had printed counterfeit notes in attempts to destabilize the other's economy, an example of economic warfare.

Counterfeit government bonds are public debt instruments that are produced without legal sanction, with the intention of "cashing them in" for authentic currency or using them as collateral to secure loans or lines of credit through legitimate channels.

== Counterfeiting of documents ==
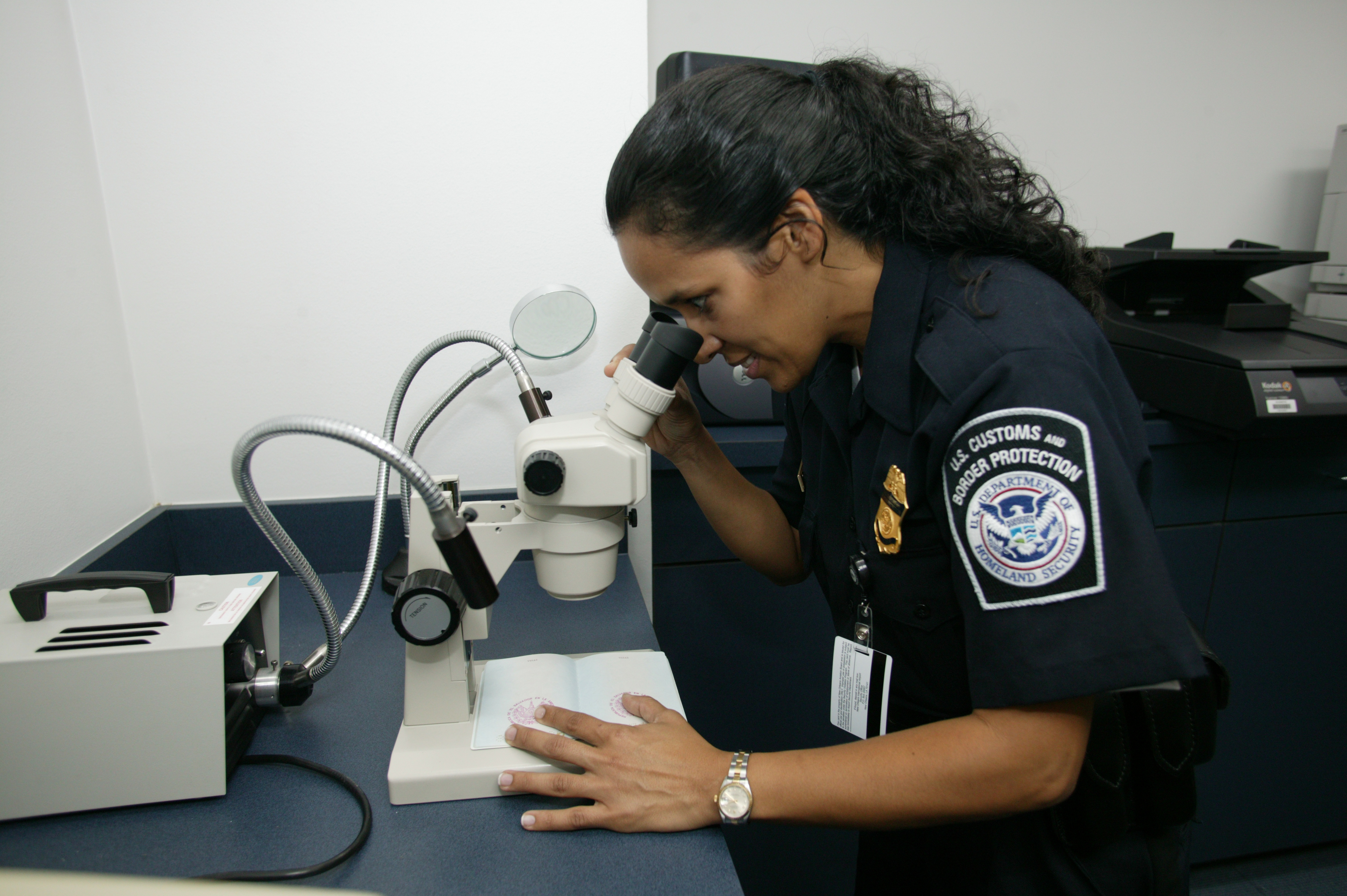
U.S. CBP Office of Field Operations agent checking the authenticity of a travel document at an international airport using a stereo microscope

Forgery is the process of making facsimiles or adapting documents with the intention to deceive. It is a form of fraud, and is often a key technique in the execution of identity theft. Uttering is a term in United States law for the forgery of non-official documents, such as a trucking company's time and weight logs.

Questioned document examination is a scientific process for investigating many aspects of various documents, and is often used to examine the provenance and verity of a suspected forgery. Security printing is a printing industry specialty, focused on creating legal documents which are difficult to forge.

== Counterfeit goods ==
Counterfeit goods are products that illegally use a registered trademark on items identical or similar to the original, designed to mislead buyers into thinking they are purchasing authentic products. Similarly, pirated goods infringe copyright, typically involving unauthorized reproductions or distributions of copyrighted works, such as movies, music, or software. The exact definitions of both counterfeit and pirated goods can vary by country, depending on local intellectual property laws.

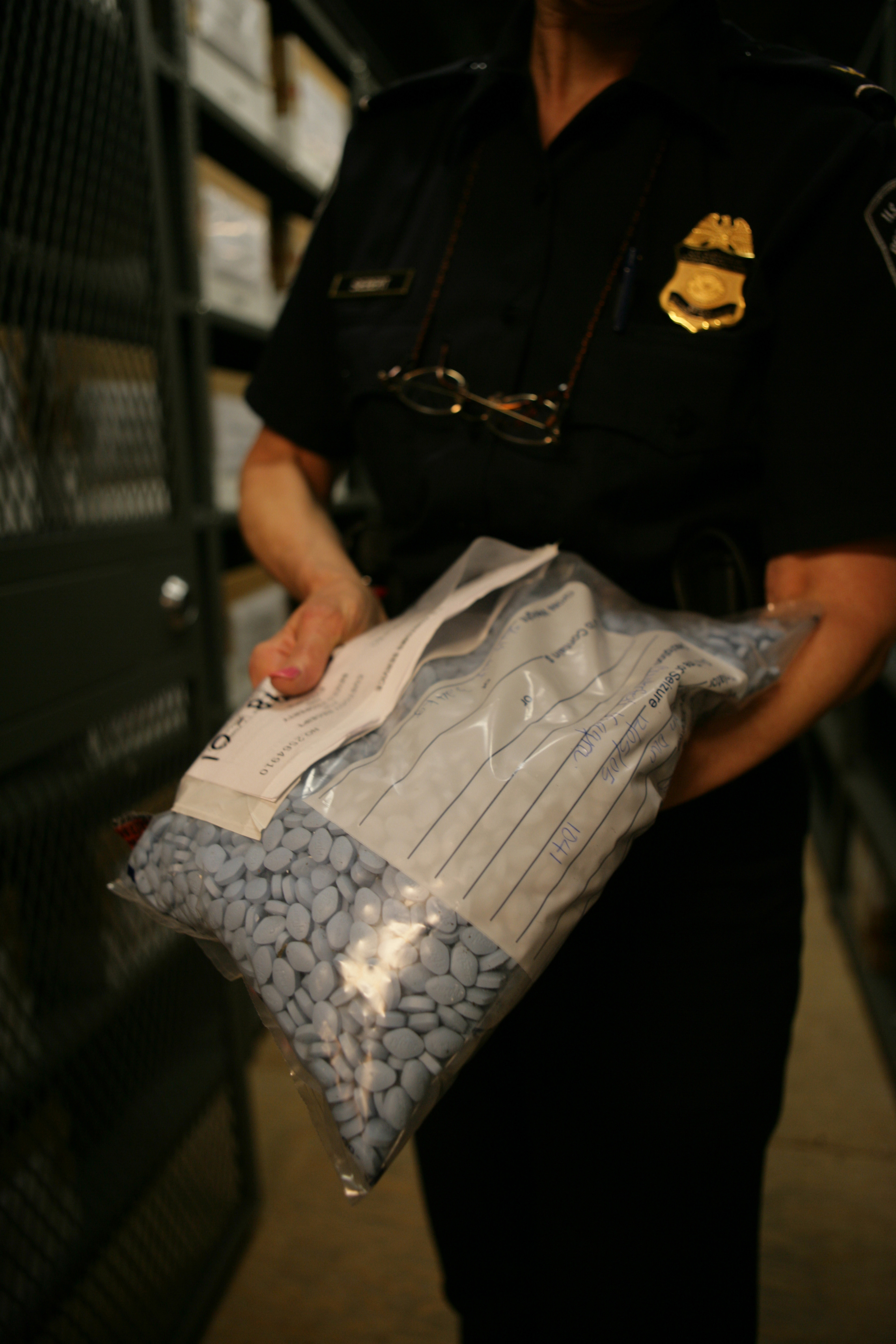
Bulk bag of counterfeit Viagra

The colloquial terms "dupe" (short for "duplicate") or "knockoff" are often used interchangeably with "counterfeit," though they have different meanings. Dupes and knockoffs generally mimic the physical look of other products without copying the brand name or logo of a trademarked item, unlike counterfeits. Despite this distinction, counterfeits are frequently misleadingly marketed as dupes.

According to the Organisation for Economic Co-operation and Development (OECD), the presence of counterfeit goods in global trade has grown substantially. In 2005, counterfeit and illegally copied products accounted for up to $200 billion in international trade. This figure rose to $250 billion by 2007, representing 1.95% of world trade, up from 1.85% in 2000. By 2019, counterfeit and pirated goods made up approximately 2.5% of global trade, valued at an estimated $464 billion. In the EU, imports of counterfeit and pirated products reached as high as €119 billion (approximately $134 billion), accounting for up to 5.8% of total imports that year.

The increase in counterfeit goods sales, driven by the rise of globalized supply chains and e-commerce, is enabled through the use of small packages, sometimes referred to as de minimis shipments. Counterfeit goods purchased from e-commerce websites or social media apps are shipped in small packages to bypass customs inspections and exploit de minimis benefits, such as duty-free imports and expedited customs processing, allowing them to reach buyers directly. In 2023, 92% of counterfeit seizures in the U.S. involved small packages.

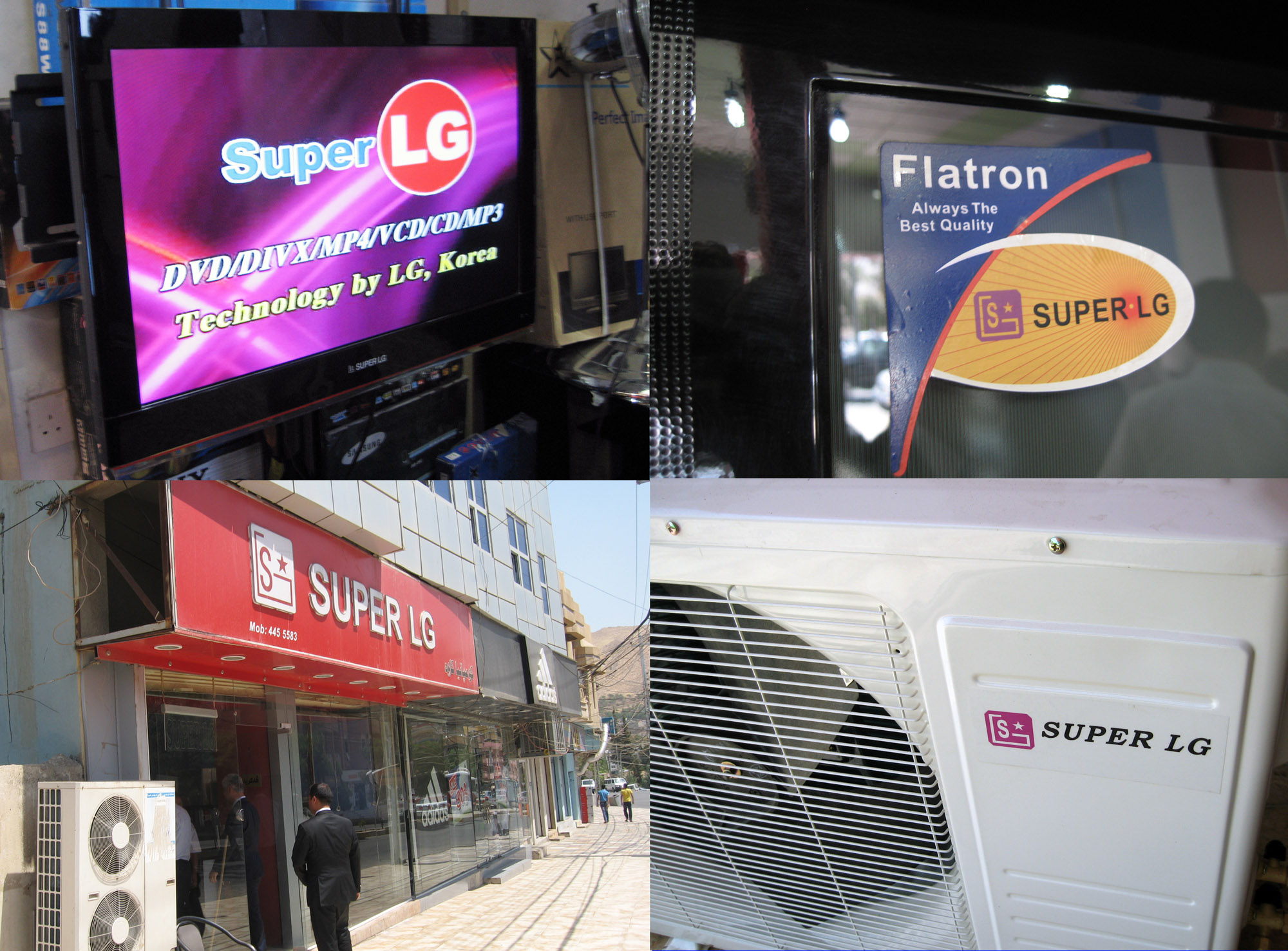
Counterfeit LG brand and products, such as televisions, monitors, air conditioners, etc.

China (including Hong Kong) is a major source of counterfeit goods, responsible for an estimated 80% of the world's counterfeits, contributing over 1.5% to its GDP, and accounting for 84% of all counterfeit items seized by U.S. Customs and Border Protection in 2023. Other significant sources include India, Thailand, the Philippines, Turkey, Vietnam, Colombia, Mexico, and the United Arab Emirates. The most frequently seized counterfeit items are footwear, clothing, leather goods, and electrical machinery and electronic equipment. In 2023, apparel and accessories made up 26.2% of the counterfeit goods seized by U.S. Customs and Border Protection.

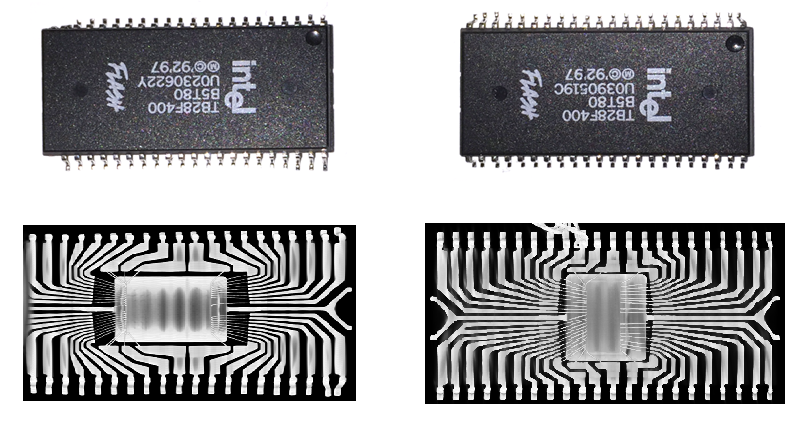
An authentic Intel flash memory IC (right) and a counterfeit replica (left); although the packaging of these ICs is the same, the X-ray images reveal that the inside structure of the fake one is different

Counterfeit components are also present in the military supply chain. A report from an investigation initiated by the United States Senate Committee on Armed Services in March 2011 revealed over 1,800 cases of suspected counterfeit electronic parts within more than 1 million defense-related products. A follow-up report in 2012 found that counterfeit parts came "overwhelmingly from China." By 2022, concerns over counterfeit components in the supply chain persisted, notably affecting the F-35 fighter jets. In 2023, Forbes reported that Chinese materials, components, and software were still present in the Department of Defense's supply chain.

== Counterfeit culture ==
Counterfeit culture is the thriving market surrounding fake streetwear, luxury and designer goods. Most commonly, these markets originate out of areas where the inability to buy popular streetwear and luxury brands has fueled more sophisticated markets for counterfeit goods. These markets have spawned the emergence of a tribe of widely available copycat brands.

In countries like North Korea and Russia where trade sanctions were imposed in the past to prevent the importation of popular brands, demand was stimulated for available counterfeit alternatives. The economic standing of a country or region also contributed to the demand for these products as the average consumer can't afford luxury prices but will gain the same social impact purchasing a knock-off whose quality is almost indistinguishable from the original's.

Designers have even begun to acknowledge the trend of counterfeit culture by referencing fake or knock-off goods in their designs. This brought counterfeit culture into the realm of popular culture and has essentially shifted global acceptance towards becoming more lenient of these products as an appropriate alternative.

== Anti-counterfeiting technologies ==
Anti-counterfeiting technologies are added to products or their packaging to allow consumers or inspectors to check whether a product is authentic. The EUIPO Observatory on Infringements of Intellectual Property Rights has developed an anti-counterfeiting technology guide, to address the lack of information on technology solutions available on the market and help companies improve their protection against counterfeiting. In this guide, the main anti-counterfeiting technologies currently on the market are described, and classified into five main categories:

- Electronic technologies
- Marking technologies
- Chemical and physical technologies
- Mechanical technologies
- Technologies for digital media

The International Standard Organization has also published standards related to the implementation of anti-counterfeiting solutions, including ISO 12931 and ISO 22381.

== See also ==
- Authentication
- Brand protection
- Coin counterfeiting
- Copyright infringement
- Counterfeit banknote detection pen
- Counterfeit medications
- Counterfeit watch
- Entertainment law
- Fauxbergé
- Gresham's law
- Illegal stamps
- Intellectual property
- Legal fake
- Philatelic fakes and forgeries
- Prescription Drug Marketing Act
- Slug
- Watered stock
