= Alexander Fersman =

Russian and mineralogist (1883–1945)

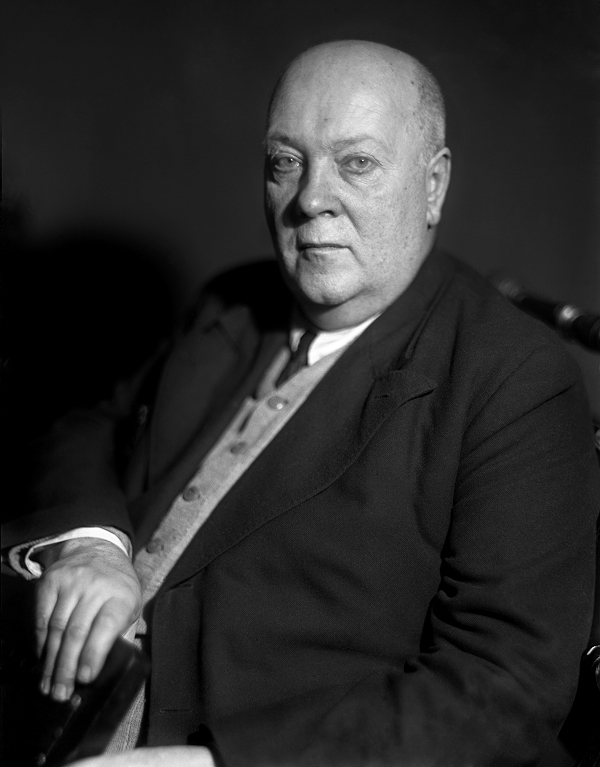
- Born: 8 November 1883; St. Petersburg, Russia
- Died: 20 May 1945 (aged 61); Sochi, Soviet Union
- Education: Moscow State University
- Scientific career
- Fields: Geochemistry, mineralogy
- Workplaces: Fersman Mineralogical Museum
- Academic advisors: Vladimir Vernadsky; Victor Goldschmidt

Signature
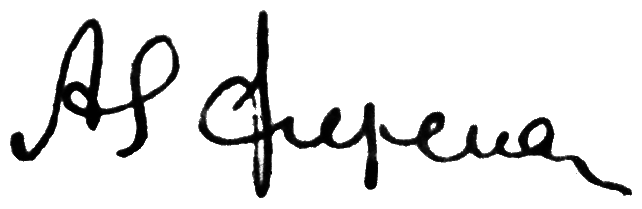

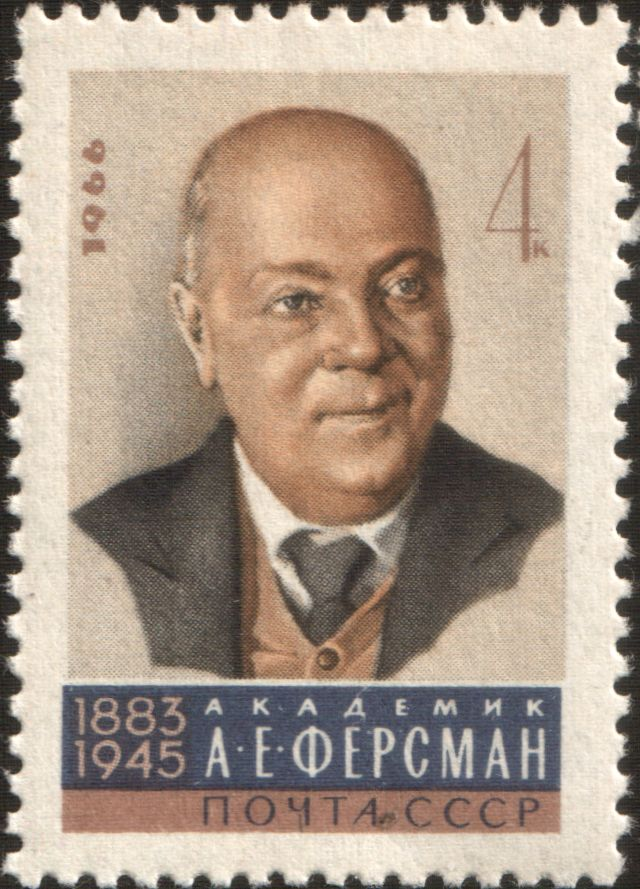
Fersman on a 1966 Soviet stamp

Alexander Evgenyevich Fersman (Russian: Александр Евгеньевич Ферсман; 8 November 1883 – 20 May 1945) was a Russian and Soviet geochemist and mineralogist, and a member of the Soviet Academy of Sciences (1919–1945).

== Early life and education ==
Fersman was born in St. Petersburg on 8 November 1883, to Evgeny Aleksandrovich Fersman, an architect and soldier, and Maria Eduardovna Kessler, a painter and pianist. He began exploring the countryside for minerals and collecting crystals while a young boy at his family's summer estate in Crimea. After graduating with honors from Odessa Classical Gymnasium in 1901, he attended the Mining Academy at Novorossisk, where he found the mineralogy courses so dull he attempted to switch his studies to Art History. Family friends persuaded him to take chemistry courses instead.

In 1903, the senior Fersman's duties as an officer in the army of the Tsar took the family to Moscow, where Alexander enrolled in the University of Moscow. In 1904, he became a doctoral student of mineralogist and geochemist Vladimir Vernadsky, who became an important influence on his philosophy and career.

In 1907–1909, Fersman began postgraduate work under Victor Mordechai Goldschmidt at Heidelberg University in Germany, and authored a major work on the crystallography of diamond. In 1908, he studied minerals in Elba Island.

== Career ==
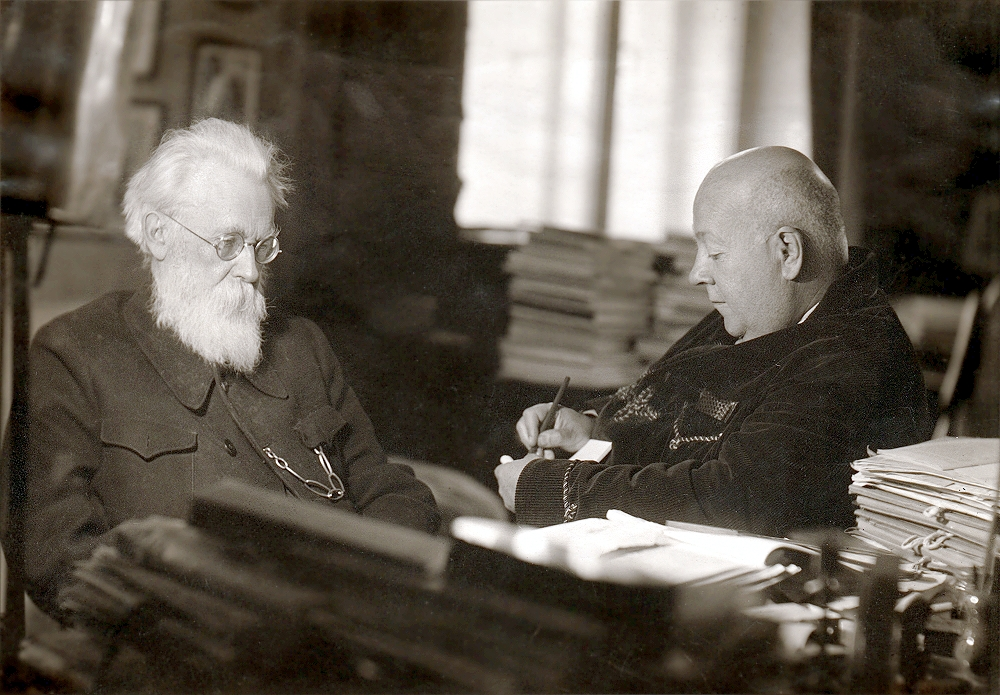
Fersman with his mentor Vernadsky in 1940

In 1910, Fersman returned to Russia, where he began his administrative and teaching career. He became curator of mineralogy at the Russian Academy of Science's Mineralogical Museum in St. Petersburg, and the museum's director in 1919, following his election as an Academician. Fersman also became a professor at the People's (Shanyavsky) University in Moscow. In 1912, he taught what may have been the world's first courses in geochemistry, and also helped found Priroda (Nature), a popular scientific journal, to which he contributed throughout his life. During World War I, Fersman formed a commission to advise the military on strategic matters involving geology, as he would do later in the Great Patriotic War. He also participated in an Academy of Science project to catalogue Russia's natural resources, and starting in 1915, travelled throughout Russia to assess mineral deposits. Lenin subsequently consulted Fersman for advice on exploiting the country's mineral resources.

After the revolution of 1917, Fersman strenuously advocated the development of the country's natural resources, particularly its mineral wealth. Numerous expeditions were organized, visiting the Urals, Crimea, Caucasus, Kazakhstan, Turkestan, the Altai Mountains, the Transbaikal region, northern Mongolia, Karelia, Tian-Shan, Kyzyl-Kum and Kara-Kum, and the Kola Peninsula. Fersman personally led several. The results included the discovery of deposits of uranium and vanadium ore in Fergana, and, in the Kara-Kum desert east of the Caspian Sea, large deposits of sulphur, which Russia had previously had to import.

The Soviet Union industrialized rapidly following Joseph Stalin's ascension to power in 1924, and by the beginning of the first five-year plan of Soviet industry in 1929, mineralogy and geochemistry had acquired high national status. From 1922 to 1934, the Soviet Academy of Sciences organized over 250 scientific expeditions related to the study of geology, geochemistry and mineralogy. Of particular importance were studies of Khibiny and Lovozero, the great alkaline massifs of the Kola Peninsula, with which Fersman was particularly associated. The Kola Peninsula was notorious for its inaccessibility, but by the mid-1930s – due largely to the efforts of Fersman and his associate N.V. Belov – Khibiny and Lovozero were among the world's largest producers of a wide range of valuable industrial minerals.

Under Fersman's leadership, the activities of the Mineralogical Museum were directed towards solving practical economic problems, researching the country's mineral deposits, and developing state-of-the-art research and laboratory techniques. In 1930, the museum was renamed the Institute for Mineralogy and Geochemistry, and in 1932, the Geochemical, Mineralogical and Crystallographic Institute. To staff it, Fersman recruited many of the nation's top scientists.

In 1934, the Soviet Academy of Sciences, including the Museum of Mineralogy, moved to Moscow. Thirty railway carriages were required to move the museum's collection of more than 60,000 specimens. The relocation took three years of intensive work. The exhibits of the museum were put on display in 1937, in time for the XVII International Geological Congress, which was held in Moscow. Fersman was the General Secretary of the Presidium and played an important role in organizing the convention.

There were a number of IGC excursions, lasting 20–30 days, to major areas of geological interest within the Soviet Union; however, the Congress was held in 1937, during the Great Purge unleashed by Stalin. This was reflected in the atmosphere within the convention. Some of the delegates – such as the outstanding Russian geologist Yu.M. Sheinmann – were arrested during the congress or immediately afterwards. Despite his regular contact with foreigners, Fersman managed to avoid suspicion, and the geological excursion to Karelia and the Kola Peninsula was described in glowing terms by C. S. Hurlbut of Harvard University.

During the Second World War, Fersman was responsible for the evacuation of some 80,000 of the Museum of Mineralogy's most valuable specimens from Moscow in 1941, and their return in 1944.

Fersman died on 20 May 1945, in the Black Sea town of Sochi, where he had gone to recover from exhaustion. He was 61.

== Works ==
Fersman wrote more than 1,500 articles and publications on crystallography, mineralogy, geology, chemistry, geochemistry, geography, aerial photography, astronomy, philosophy, art, archeology, soil science, and biology. Among them were: Geochemistry in Russia (1922); Chemical Elements of the Earth and Cosmos (1923); Geochemistry, vols. I–IV (1933–1939); The Search for Mineral Deposits on the Basis of Geochemistry and Mineralogy (1939).

He was also a great popularizer of science in Russia. In addition to his contributions to Priroda and other journals, he wrote many books for general audiences, including: Three Years beyond the Arctic Circle (1924); Mineralogy for Everyone (1928, updated and re-published 1935); Twenty-Five Years of Soviet Natural Science (1944); Reminiscences about Minerals (1945); The March of Soviet Science (1945); Geochemistry for Everyone (pub. 1958)

== Awards and honors ==
Alexander Fersman was awarded the Lenin Prize (1929), USSR State Prize (1942), Wollaston Medal of the Geological Society of London (1943), and Order of the Red Banner of Labour. His name was given to the Fersman Mineralogical Museum, the minerals fersmite and fersmanite, a crater on the Moon, the research vessel RV Geolog Fersman, and streets in multiple Russian cities, including Moscow, Monchegorsk, and Apatity. Since 1946, the Soviet, and then Russian Academy of Sciences was giving the Fersman Award for outstanding research in geochemistry and mineralogy.
