= Winders =

Winders is a term describing new forms of social success in Western societies. A contraction of "windy winners," it refers to individuals uninhibited about their success who juxtapose rather than reconcile rival existential expectations. This concept follows earlier social success models like yuppies and bobos, drawing on the work of Michael Hartmann, Peter Meiksins, and Peter Whalley. John W. Leigh characterizes winders as "multi-consumers," equally comfortable in art galleries or cinemas, and appreciating both classical composers like Bach and pop stars like Beyoncé.

== Origins ==
The term “winders” was originally coined in 2008 by the sociologist John W. Leigh, in his article Moving towards new forms of social success, describing the new forms of social success in the United States, and in Western societies. The term (a contraction of the expression “windy winners”) goes back to the original way of experiencing social success by individuals uninhibited with regards to their own success, not looking as much to reconcile rival existential expectations (such as the bobos, for example) but rather to juxtapose them in a way which is not seeking to constitute a system.

== Description ==
The analysis of this new group is positioned along the same lines as the social success models embodied respectively by yuppies, “hardcore winners” (traders and other “golden boys” of the 1980s), and then bobos. It borrows from the critical sociology of Michael Hartmann, as well as employment sociologists Peter Meiksins and Peter Whalley, whose work Putting work in its place: a quiet revolution details the paradigm shift borne by the winders within the American employment market. As J. W. Leigh puts it: “In cultural terms, for example, he is a "multi-consumer": capable of frequenting art galleries or the screens of a public cinema, and listening to Haydn and Bach as much as Beyonce or Michael Jackson.”

== See also ==
- Bobo
- Yuppie
- Critical theory
- Michael Parenti
- Memetics
- Socionics
