= Bernard M. Judge =

American journalist (1940–2019)

Bernard Judge (January 6, 1940 – June 14, 2019) was an American journalist who served in management positions at the City News Bureau of Chicago, the Chicago Tribune, the Chicago Sun-Times and the Chicago Daily Law Bulletin.

== Early life and education ==
Judge was born on Chicago's South Side to an Irish immigrant father. Judge graduated from Our Lady of Peace Catholic School. Judge attended Leo Catholic High School in Chicago. Judge moved with his family to Oak Park, Illinois, and transferred to Fenwick High School in Oak Park, where he graduated in 1957. Judge then attended John Carroll University but did not graduate.

== Professional career ==
Judge served in the United States Army as a clerk at a Nike Missile site in Pennsylvania. After being discharged from the Army in 1964, Judge worked briefly at the old U.S. Steel South Works site prior to starting his career the newspaper business. Judge eventually built a national reputation. When actor Edward Asner portrayed a city editor Lou Grant, he sought Judge's advice about the nuances of running a newsroom.

Judge began his career as a reporter at City News Bureau of Chicago in 1965. Judge subsequently took a job with the Chicago Tribune to cover state and federal courts and government. During Judge's tenure, two investigative reporting projects he directed won the Pulitzer Prize. Judge later served as a juror for the 2000 Pulitzer Prize awards. Judge returned to the City News Bureau of Chicago in 1983 as the Editor and General Manager.

Judge then joined the Chicago Sun-Times as the metropolitan editor and associate editor, where he directed a series and other projects that won over 20 state and national awards, which the series by Charles Nicodemus killed the plan to establish a new central library and set the stage for the Harold Washington Library.

Judge left the Chicago Sun-Times to become the editor and vice president of the Chicago Daily Law Bulletin. Judge became the Law Bulletin's publisher in 2001. At the newspaper's 150th anniversary celebration in 2004, Chief Judge Joel M. Flaum of the 7th Circuit U.S. Court of Appeals said, "The paper has bound many generations of lawyers together. It is extremely well led by Bernard Judge, who has been a beacon of excellence wherever he's been. And never has that beacon shone more brightly than at the Law Bulletin." Upon Judge's retirement in 2007, former Illinois Supreme Court Chief Justice Thomas R. Fitzgerald stated "He has endeared himself to hundreds, if not thousands, of lawyers because of his integrity. He understood it wasn't only getting the story, it was getting it right."

== Retirement ==
After retiring, Judge was a non-lawyer Hearing Board Officer for the Illinois Attorney Registration and Disciplinary Commission (ARDC), where he served as a trial judge in lawyer disciplinary cases. In April, 2012, the Illinois Supreme Court appointed Judge to serve as a Commissioner of the ARDC.

Judge also served on the Illinois State Admissions Review Committee that was responsible for reviewing claims that some applicants to the University of Illinois at Urbana-Champaign received special treatment. The blue ribbon panel's response to the University of Illinois clout scandal included recommendations of reforms to improve the fairness and transparency of the admissions process. Judge also become a first-time author in retirement. Along with Neal Samors, Judge co-authored Chicago's Lake Shore Drive: Urban America's Most Beautiful Roadway.

== Personal ==
Judge was married to Kimbeth Wehrli Judge, and had three children.

=== Death ===
Judge died from pancreatic cancer at his Chicago home on June 14, 2019.

== Awards ==
- Chicago Journalism Hall of Fame
- Illinois Bar Foundation, 2006 Distinguished Award for Excellence
- Constitutional Rights Foundation of Chicago Bill of Rights in Action award (2001)
- Headline Club lifetime achievement award
- City Club of Chicago Excellence in Journalism award
- Illinois Press Association James C. Craven Freedom of the Press Award
- Fenwick High School Hall of Fame
- Fenwick Accipiter Award (first recipient, 1997)

== Board Memberships ==
- Constitutional Rights Foundation Chicago
- Catholic Charities
- Illinois First Amendment Center (Chairman, 2008)
- Fenwick High School
