= City News Bureau of Chicago =

- Industry: News agency
- Founded: 1890
- Defunct: 2005
- Headquarters: Chicago
- Key people: Walter Spirko; Arnold Dornfeld; Melvyn Douglas; Susan Kuczka; Paul Zimbrakos; Milton Golin; Bernard Judge; Isaac Gershman; Joseph Reilly

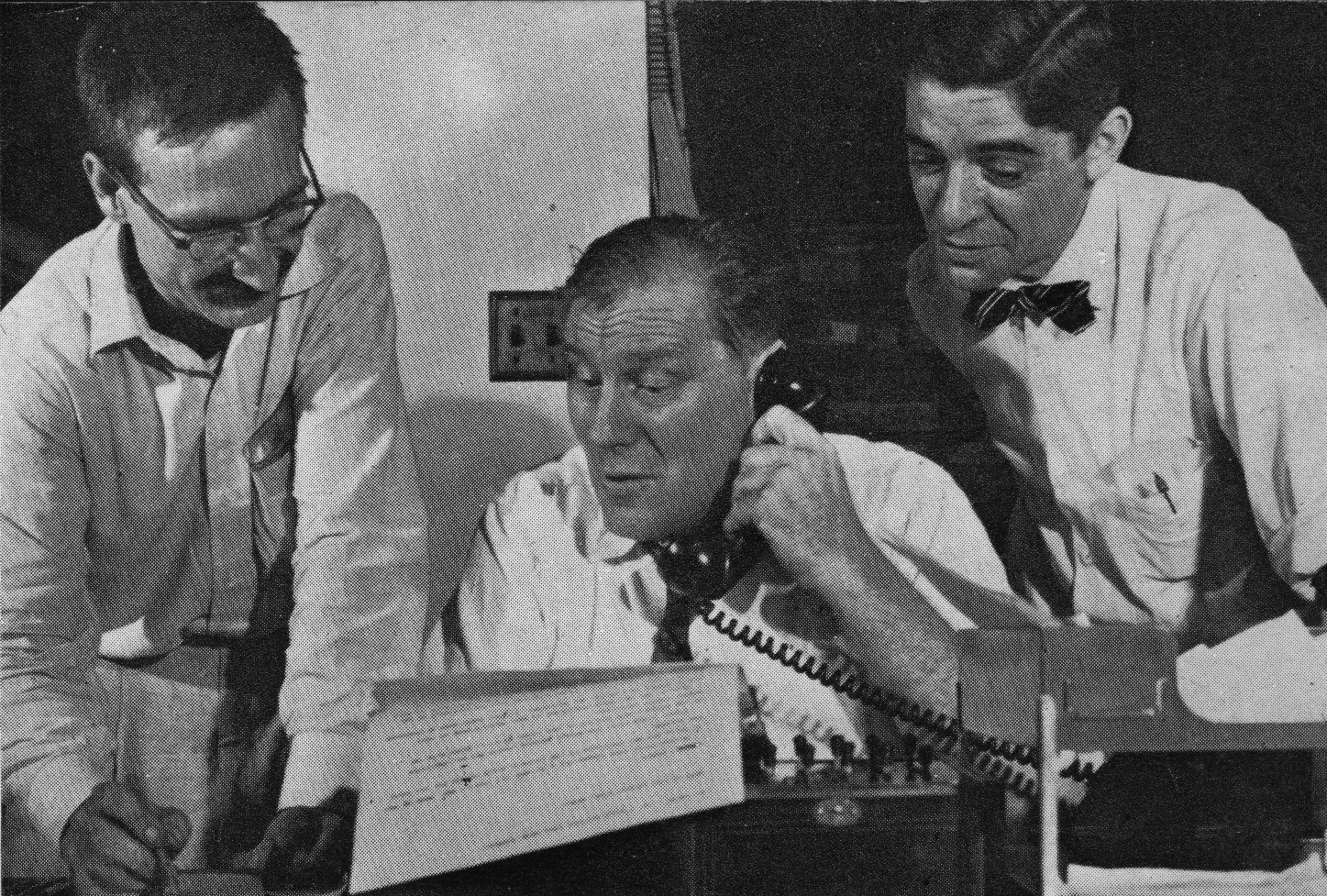
Taken at City News Bureau of Chicago, 1959. Left to right, Fred Thomas, assistant night news editor; Arnold A. "Dorny" Dornfeld, longtime night editor; Alex Zelchenko, night radio-TV editor. Previously reproduced in Dornfeld's book, Behind the Front Page (previously titled, Hello Sweetheart, Get Me Rewrite!), and in the June, 1959 Trib magazine.

City News Bureau of Chicago (CNB), or City Press (1890–2005), was a news bureau that served as one of the first cooperative news agencies in the United States. It was founded in 1890 by the newspapers of Chicago to provide a common source of local and breaking news and also used by them as a training ground for new reporters, described variously as "journalism's school of hard knocks" or "the reporter's boot camp." Hundreds of reporters "graduated" from the City News Bureau into newspaper dailies—both local and national—or other avenues of writing.

== Operations ==
The City News Bureau had reporters in all important news sites, courthouses, Chicago City Hall, the County Building, Criminal Courts, as well as having as many as ten police reporters on duty. It operated around the clock and all year round. The reporters, though young, worked in competition with some of the best reporters in the country, working on the same stories as all the others, questioning politicians and police, and fighting for scoops.

They covered every single death reported to the coroner's office, every important meeting, every news conference, every court case that had once been a news story, even if the trial wasn't newsworthy.

The training was rigorous. The reporters were all amateurs when they came to work, but the rewrite men were professionals, accustomed to teaching in a hard school. Turnover was rapid at CNB as reporters eagerly sought newspaper jobs as soon as they felt they had paid their dues in CNB trenches.

One graduate was Kurt Vonnegut. He described his work there in the late 1940s in terms that could have been used by almost any other City Press reporter of any era:

"I'm very proud I worked there. It was like being a soldier."

"Well, the Chicago City News Bureau was a tripwire for all the newspapers in town when I was there, and there were five papers, I think. We were out all the time around the clock and every time we came across a really juicy murder or scandal or whatever, they’d send the big time reporters and photographers, otherwise they’d run our stories. So that’s what I was doing, and I was going to university at the same time."

A legendary story held that a young reporter who called in a story of the slaying of an infant was sent back to get the answer to the question, "What color were the dead baby's eyes?" Certainly, all the young reporters were sent back to get more information so that they would learn to get it in the first place. Another watchword: "If your mother tells you she loves you, check it out with two independent sources" or "If your mother says she loves you, check it out."

The City News Bureau had special operations for covering elections in Chicago and Cook County, providing regular updates precinct by precinct years before such coverage was common. A similar service reported on the scores of most high-school games in Chicago, but otherwise there was no sports coverage.

The film Call Northside 777, in which James Stewart plays a reporter whose articles free an innocent man from prison, was based on a story that originated at the City News Bureau.

The City News Bureau broke the story of the St. Valentine's Day Massacre in 1929, but, for once, didn't quite believe its reporter, Walter Spirko, and sent the following bulletin:

Six men are reported to have been seriously injured . . .

Spirko continued as a Chicago reporter for many years, breaking a story of thieving policemen known as the Summerdale police scandal.

The City News Bureau didn't always confine its scoops to local stories. One momentous non-local event originated on a quiet Sunday in 1941, when a reporter at the Damen Avenue police station on the city's near-northwest side was slowly twisting a dial on the desk sergeant's short wave radio when he heard the static-punctuated voice of an amateur radio operator telling another "ham" that "bombs are falling all over Honolulu." The eavesdropping reporter could hear explosions in the background of the radio transmission. He phoned what he had heard to his city editor, who immediately sent bulletins to the CNB's four major newspapers and the member of the Associated Press. It caught the AP by surprise and within seconds the report was on news wires worldwide. CNB was the first to break the news of Japan's Attack on Pearl Harbor.

Playwright Charles MacArthur, co-author of the play The Front Page, was a City Press reporter; several of the characters in the play were based on City Press personalities, notably the skittish assistant managing editor Larry Mulay.

Other well-known alumni: syndicated columnist and Politico editor Roger Simon, reclusive media mogul Fred Eychaner, environmental journalist William Allen, investigative reporter Seymour Hersh, The New York Times columnist David Brooks (author of Bobos in Paradise), pop artist Claes Oldenburg, public-television personality John Callaway, editor Russell Freeburg, consumer advocate David Horowitz, Pulitzer Prize-winning columnist Mike Royko, Pulitzer Prize-winning editorial cartoonist Herbert Lawrence Block (commonly known as Herblock), and Jack Star, later to become senior editor of Look (American magazine) and perennial freelance writer for Chicago Magazine.

Clarence John Boettiger, son-in-law of Franklin Delano Roosevelt, became a Chicago Tribune police reporter after working for the City News Bureau to begin his career. Elizabeth Austin of the bureau later became a speechwriter for one Illinois governor and communications director for another. Tom Quinn, who worked for City News in 1964 while a student at Northwestern, later managed Jerry Brown's first campaign for governor of California, became chairman of California's Air Resources Board and the state's Environmental Secretary, and served as chairman for two of Los Angeles Mayor Tom Bradley's campaigns.

Other mainstays of City News Bureau's staff included Arnold Dornfeld, Melvyn Douglas, Susan Kuczka, Paul Zimbrakos, Milton Golin, Bernard Judge. Isaac Gershman served as managing editor from 1931-1964.

The City News Bureau had three teletype wires, one for the Chicago dailies, one for radio and television stations, and one for press releases. In addition, it owned a pneumatic tube system that ran under Chicago streets connecting all the Chicago dailies, including those that no longer existed. The office kept a speaker system tuned live 24 hours to the coded Chicago police radio dispatcher frequency, announcing addresses to which City News Bureau reporters were sent.

As Chicago went down to only two daily newspapers, the City News Bureau slowly faded and was reduced to a minor operation. It was still widely used by both papers, the Chicago Tribune and Chicago Sun-Times, until the Sun-Times decided to pull out of the joint ownership agreement it had inherited from the City News Bureau's original owners, for which the Sun-Times was a successor paper. The PR Newswire, which was part of City News, was sold; the Sun-Times decided it cost too much to keep City News running, and it was closed after its last dispatch February 28, 1999. Electronic news media—both radio and television—both used City News throughout the 1990s, until the Sun-Times, owned by Conrad Black's Hollinger International, decided to pull out. (After Black was indicted in 2005 on charges of looting Hollinger, some speculated his desire to squeeze cash out of the company's properties helped hasten the demise of the original City News.)

The New City News Service, owned by the Tribune, opened soon thereafter, and soon changed its name to the City News Service. Though smaller, it was run by Paul Zimbrakos, a 40-plus year employee of the old CNB, and the bureau's last editor. Sun-Times management had thought they would be able to create a new, cheaper wire service, staffed with few people. When that venture—called Alliance News—failed, for a while the Sun-Times used the part-time help of Medill News Service, staffed by unpaid journalism students from the Medill School of Journalism. The Sun-Times, however, was barred from receiving the New City News Service wire because of its being in competition with the Tribune.

Though the Tribune had been hailed by former City Newsers as a savior of CNB, on December 1, 2005, the Tribune informed the 19 employees of City News Service that their jobs were being eliminated as part of cost-cutting measures going on throughout the Tribune Company. (See Associated Press and other news stories of December 1 & December 2, 2005.) Tribune editors and executives reasoned that CNS was providing the Tribune's competitors' Web sites with news that the paper itself should have exclusively, the better to compete in an age of Internet news distribution.

The City News Service closed at the end of 2005, and was swallowed into a smaller Tribune Internet news operation.

City News lives on, in spirit, at least, at the Sun-Times. In February 2006, the Sun-Times worked to fill the void felt at the city's TV and radio stations by the demise of the old City News by starting its own 24-hour newswire, the STNG Wire. The key to the operation, staffed by veterans of both the original and the Tribune-run City News, is the Daybook, the invaluable daily listing of press conferences, court activity and other events throughout the Chicago metropolitan area, which is shared with subscribers and the Sun Times News Group family. The STNG wire also covers the blood and guts news—the fires, murders, shootings, stabbings, automobile accidents—that City News was known for, 24 hours a day, seven days a week.

Former City News Editor Paul Zimbrakos continued to teach young journalists through his City News Bureau course at Loyola University Chicago. Here is the course description from the Loyola School of Communication website:

"In fall 2009 the School of Communication started offering students access to a Chicago news gathering institution the City News Bureau. For over 100 years Chicago hosted one of the best news bureaus in the country. Young reporters learned at The City New Bureau of Chicago how the city worked and how they could best cover the city. We are re-launching that bureau in the form of a course this fall. It will be taught by two remarkable journalism veterans. Paul Zimbrakos was the Managing Editor of the bureau for a number of years before it closed its doors and tutored many of the best journalists in the country. Jack Smith was the former CBS Bureau Chief in Chicago and Washington DC. Together they will make this class a rich learning lab and help students discover how best to cover a city and its inner-workings."

Zimbrakos died May 31, 2022, according to CBS News Chicago.
