= Paul Tierney =

Paul Tierney may refer to:

- Paul Tierney (footballer) (born 1982), English-born Irish footballer
- Paul Tierney (referee) (born 1980), English football referee
- Paul Tierney (rugby league) (1919–1973), Australian rugby league footballer
- Paul Tierney (hurler) (born 1982), Irish hurler and Cumbria-based fellrunner
- Paul E. Tierney (born 1943), American businessman
