= On Paradise Drive =

2004 book by David Brooks

On Paradise Drive: How We Live Now (And Always Have) in the Future Tense
- First edition
- Author: David Brooks
- Subject: Social psychology
- Publisher: Simon & Schuster
- Publication date: 2004
- Publication place: United States
- Pages: 304
- ISBN: 978-0-7432-2739-1
- OCLC: 54400126

On Paradise Drive is the second book written by conservative New York Times commentator David Brooks, released four years after his first book, Bobos in Paradise. Using a similar style, his second work seeks to make a connection between the oft-maligned material strivings of middle-class Americans and a more profound focus on one's future, which he believes to be deeply ingrained in American society.

== See also ==
- The Social Animal
- Bobos in Paradise
