= Fenwick High School (Oak Park, Illinois) =

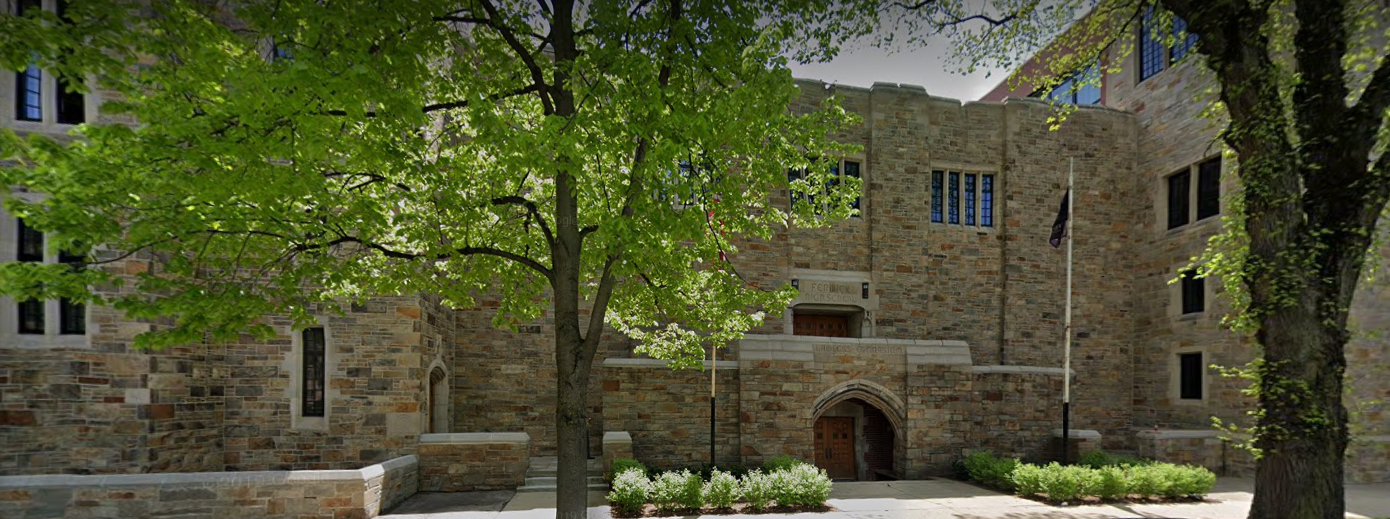

Location
- 505 Washington Boulevard; Oak Park, Illinois 60302; United States; 41°52′52″N 87°47′19″W

Information
- Type: Private secondary
- Motto: Veritas
- Religious affiliation: Roman Catholic
- Opened: 1929
- Oversight: Archdiocese of Chicago
- President: Otto Rutt
- Principal: John Finan
- Teaching staff: 87.4 (on an FTE basis)
- Grades: 9–12
- Enrollment: 1,101 (2021–22)
- Student to teacher ratio: 12.6
- Campus: Large suburb
- Colors: Black and white
- Athletics conference: Chicago Catholic League & Girls Catholic Athletic Conference
- Nickname: Friars
- Publication: Touchstone
- Newspaper: The Wick
- Yearbook: Blackfriars Yearbook
- Affiliation: Dominicans
- Website: fenwickfriars.com

Fenwick High School is a private Catholic college preparatory school located in Oak Park, a town in Cook County, Illinois, United States. Fenwick was founded in 1929 and is a ministry of the Province of St. Albert the Great (Dominican Friars). It is the only school directly operated and staffed by the Order of Preachers (Dominican friars) in the United States. It is named in honor of the first bishop of Cincinnati, Dominican friar Edward Dominic Fenwick, O.P.

== History ==
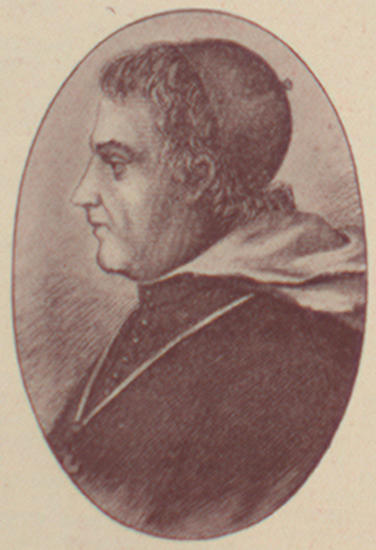
Bishop Edward D. Fenwick, the namesake of Fenwick High School

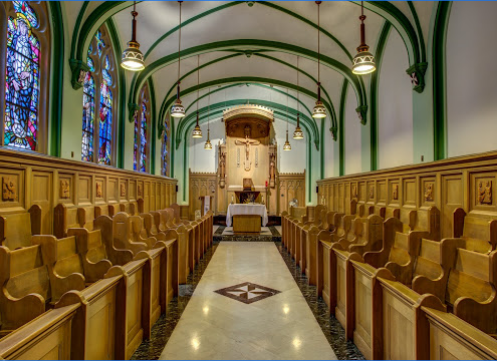
Fenwick's school chapel with stained glass windows created by Rinaldo Angelo Zarlenga, O.P., a Dominican Blackfriar from Rome, Italy

Fenwick High School was founded as an all-boys college preparatory high school in 1929 by the Catholic Order of Dominican Fathers and Brothers of the Province of St. Joseph.

Since its founding, Fenwick has maintained a strict dress code which includes slacks, dress shirts and ties for the boys, and plaid skirts for the girls. During assemblies, all students are required to wear blazers and boys are additionally required to wear ties.

Fenwick was originally intended to be a prep school for matriculation to the University of Notre Dame in the Midwest and Georgetown University on the East Coast, similar to Phillips Academy Andover's matriculation to Yale, Portsmouth Abbey School's matriculation to Fordham University and Boston College and Phillips Exeter Academy's matriculation to Harvard.

In 1939, the St. Joseph Province was divided and Fenwick High School became part of the new Province of St. Albert the Great, with headquarters in Chicago.

Fenwick became coeducational in 1992, rather than raise tuition costs or see enrollment decline. Fenwick's first coeducational graduating class, was led by valedictorian Bridgid Esposito, one of the few girls in her class.

Today, Fenwick is known as a secondary school.

Students have access to many athletic facilities, including a baseball field, two football fields, a softball diamond, a pool, and a soccer field on the campus of Fenwick's Dominican Priory in the nearby suburb of River Forest.

In 1983, Fenwick was selected by the U.S. Department of Education as a Blue Ribbon School. On January 18, 1999, U.S. News & World Report classified Fenwick as an "Outstanding American High School", making Fenwick tied for the #1 ranked preparatory school in the Chicago area. 290 of the 211 students in the 2009 graduating class received 718 academic scholarships to top universities around the country, with the monetary value of these awards in excess of $16,000,000 (up from $13,900,000 in 2007–2008, $12,555,800 in 2006–2007 and 9,370,000 in 2005–2006). The 2009 graduating class also boasted 187 Presidential Scholars and 30 National Merit finalists, with 22 others receiving commendation for being named to the top 5% in the nation. Fenwick's 2010–2011 class achieved $40,000,000 in merit based scholarships.

Around the time Fenwick started admitting girls, there was a proposal to officially move classes to the school's priory in River Forest, or construct a brand new school in collaboration with nearby Trinity High School, its all-girls counterpart run by the Dominican Sisters. The idea almost passed, but was dropped when Fenwick insisted on maintaining complete control over the standards of the new school. Instead, Fenwick has commenced several expansion campaigns at their present location in Oak Park based around their original neo-Gothic designed school created by the New York architect Wilfred E. Anthony, who also redesigned the Basilica of the Sacred Heart, Indiana for the University of Notre Dame in South Bend, Indiana. The latest expansions include: a new field house with a 1,100-seat gymnasium and a 450-seat natatorium; several new classrooms and updated athletic lockers; a new school entrance and gateway inspired by the Arch at Northwestern University; and additional science laboratories and art studios, all of which are in keeping with the original Neo-Gothic look of Fenwick's school and priory.

Fenwick is the only high school in the United States owned and operated by the Dominican Order.

== Academics ==
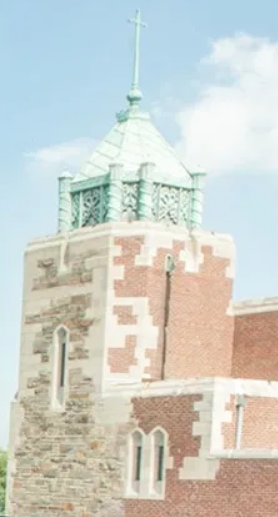
Fenwick's Gothic Tower

The first sentence of the school's philosophy statement, defines the school as a "college preparatory high school". Students are required to study four years of theology, English, mathematics, and a foreign language in order to graduate.

As a part of the third-year theology course, students are required to plan and conduct a "Christian Service Project". The project requires a minimum of thirty hours of service, no more than 20 of which may be completed prior to the start of the student's junior year.

The school offers AP Calculus BC, and gives students the option to take either the "AB" or "BC" test at the end of the year. Beyond AP Calculus, the school offers courses in multivariable calculus, linear algebra and differential equations.

== Extracurricular achievements ==
=== Athletics ===
The Fenwick Friars compete in two conferences. Male teams compete in the Chicago Catholic League (CCL), and female teams compete in the East Suburban Catholic Conference. The school competes in state championship series sponsored by the Illinois High School Association (IHSA).

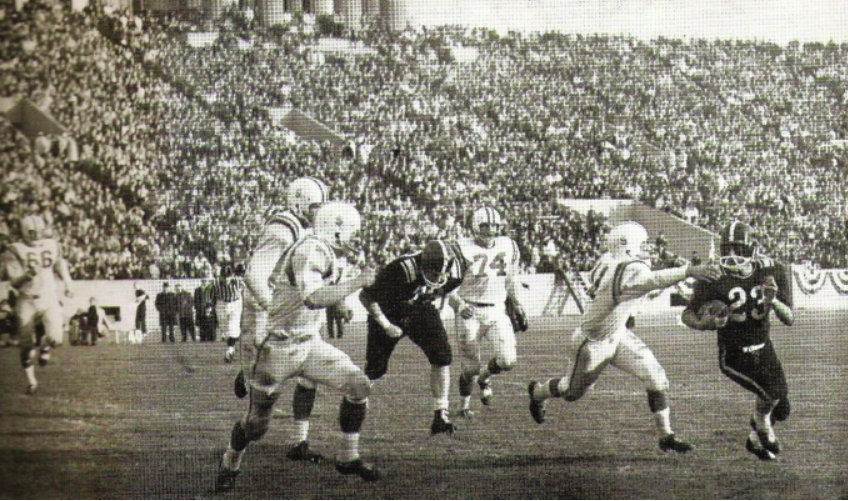
Fenwick's football team playing in the Prep Bowl at Soldier Field

Prior to the institution of a state playoff system for football in the 1970s, Fenwick competed to play in the Prep Bowl, which pitted the champions of the CCL against the champion of the Chicago Public League. Fenwick won two Prep Bowl titles at the game's usual home of Soldier Field. The first was in 1945, when a crowd of 80,000 fans saw Fenwick defeat Tilden High School, 20–6. The second was in 1962, and saw Fenwick defeat Schurz High School, 40–0. The win not only capped an undefeated season, but was played before over 91,000 fans; the third-largest crowd to witness a high school football game in Illinois history. The 1945 game is tied for seventh in terms of crowd size. The Prep Bowl has continued as a separate competition since the introduction of the statewide playoff, for teams which do not make those playoffs or are eliminated early, and Fenwick has won it in 1991 and 2010.

Sports Illustrated included Bishop Fenwick in its 2007 list of the "top high schools in each of the 50 states and D.C.", recognizing Fenwick as having the best athletic program in Illinois. Fenwick's 2006–2007 swimming and swim/polo teams produced 12 NISCA Academic All-American athletes. For 2009, two state championships were achieved in water polo, 11 regional, sectional or supersectional championships were earned, along with 15 conference titles. There were also 17 All-State athletes, 19 All-American athletes and 12 All-Academic athletes named. Five students were granted NCAA athletic scholarships.

=== Non-athletic activities ===
The Wick (school newspaper), The Blackfriars Yearbook, and the Touchstone (literary magazine) have all been recognized with awards by the American Scholastic Press Association. The 2006–2007 edition of Touchstone was awarded first place with special honors by the American Scholastic Press Association, placing Fenwick's publication at the top 5% of all high school literary publications in the country. Touchstone has earned 970/1000 possible points by the American Scholastic Press Association, thereby allowing it to be a contender for the "Most Outstanding High School Literary and Art Magazine".

== Notable alumni ==
=== Public service and politics ===
- Daniel Cronin (class of 1977), former DuPage County Board chairman, former Illinois state senator representing Illinois' 21st Legislative District (1993–2010)
- William J. Cullerton (class of 1941), World War II flying ace and radio host; inducted into the Illinois Military Aviation Hall of Fame; 4th highest ace of World War II, with a total of 29 hits
- Jim Durkin (class of 1979), Republican member of the Illinois House of Representatives 1995–2003 and Illinois House Republican Leader 2013–2023
- Michael D. Healy (class of 1945), U.S. Army 1945–1981; highly decorated for valor in the Korean War and Vietnam War; inspiration for Colonel Mike in the book and movie The Green Berets
- Joseph Kerwin (class of 1949), NASA astronaut who flew on the Skylab 2 mission, becoming the first American medical doctor in space; CAPCOM for the Apollo 13 mission
- Chris Nybo, Republican member of the Illinois Senate, and the Illinois House of Representatives
- Pat Quinn (class of 1967), Illinois state treasurer (1991–1995), Illinois lieutenant governor (2001–2009) and Illinois governor (2009–2015)
- Anne Smedinghoff (class of 2005), diplomat who served in Venezuela and Afghanistan

=== Arts, sciences, and letters ===
- Philip Caputo (class of 1959), author (A Rumor of War); Pulitzer Prize-winning reporter for coverage of Chicago election fraud
- Patrick Creadon (class of 1985), documentary filmmaker (Wordplay, I.O.U.S.A., Catholics vs Convicts); nominated for an Emmy Award, twice nominated for the Grand Jury Prize at the Sundance Film Festival
- Aimee Garcia (class of 1996), actress (Veronica on the George Lopez TV series)
- Bernard M. Judge (class of 1957), part of a Pulitzer Prize-winning team, Pulitzer Prize juror, Chicago Journalism Hall of Fame, journalism professor at the Medill School of Journalism of Northwestern University
- Jim Quinlan (class of 1952), screenwriter and author
- R. Emmett Tyrrell (class of 1961), founder of The American Spectator; best-selling author of Madame Hillary: The Dark Road to the White House and The Clinton Crack-Up
- Gene Wolande (class of 1974), character actor, writer, and director

=== Athletics and gaming ===
- Fred Baer (class of 1951), Most Valuable Player on the 1954 Michigan Wolverines football team
- Bates Battaglia (class of 1993), NHL forward (1997–2004, 2005–2012); played for the Carolina Hurricanes during the 2002 Stanley Cup Finals
- Colby Burnett (class of 2001), Jeopardy! champion
- Ryan Fitzgerald (class of 2012), MLB infielder
- John Giannini, head coach of La Salle University men's basketball team
- Mike Heathcott, former MLB player (Chicago White Sox)
- Bryce Hopkins (class of 2021), basketball player
- Johnny Lattner (class of 1950), former professional football player for the Pittsburgh Steelers; won the 1953 Heisman Trophy playing for the University of Notre Dame; one of only two two–time winners of the Maxwell Award (1952 and 1953); elected to the College Football Hall of Fame in 1979
- Erin Lawless (class of 2003), played international basketball for Slovakia
- Scottie Lindsey (class of 2014), guard for the Long Island Nets
- Tricia Liston (class of 2010), WNBA player
- Corey Maggette (class of 1998), NBA forward (1999–2013); first–round draft pick in the 1999 NBA draft; has spent most of his career with the Los Angeles Clippers; currently an analyst with Fox Sports West
- Nate Marshall (class of 2025), college football defensive end for the Michigan Wolverines
- Ben Ponzio (class of 1993), 2007 World Series of Poker Bracelet Winner in the $2,000 No Limit Texas Hold' em event
- Mike Rabold (class of 1955), NFL offensive lineman (1959–62, 1964–67), mostly with the Chicago Bears
- Dave Schrage (class of 1979), collegiate head baseball coach at Northern Iowa University (1991–99), Northern Illinois University (2000–2002), University of Evansville (2003–2006), and University of Notre Dame (2006–2010)
- Ken Sitzberger (class of 1963), diver who won the gold medal in the 3-meter springboard at the 1964 Summer Olympics; three time U.S. champion; television color commentator for 16 years; inducted into the International Swimming Hall of Fame in 1994
- Mike Smith (class of 2016), basketball player who plays professionally in Germany
- Robert Spillane (class of 2014), professional football player for the New England Patriots
- Tim Stapleton (class of 2002), former NHL center of the Atlanta Thrashers
- Marques Sullivan (class of 1996), professional offensive lineman for the Buffalo Bills, New York Giants, New England Patriots, and Chicago Rush

=== Business and industry ===
- Edward A. Brennan (class of 1951), former CEO of Sears, Roebuck and Co. (1986–1995); later served on the boards of American Airlines, McDonald's, 3M, and Exelon
- George M. Keller (class of 1941), chairman and CEO of Chevron Corporation
- A. G. Lafley (class of 1965), president & CEO (2000–present) and chairman of the board (2002–present) of Procter & Gamble
- Michael R. Quinlan (class of 1962), former chairman of the board (1990–1999) and CEO (1987–1998) of the McDonald's Corporation; director of Dun & Bradstreet since 2000
- Paul E. Tierney, Jr. (class of 1960), director of Liz Claiborne Inc., member of the Council on Foreign Relations, and adjunct professor at Columbia Business School

== Notable staff ==
- Pascal Bedrossian, former French pro soccer player in France and US; former coach of Fenwick varsity girls' soccer team
- John Jardine, football coach (1959–63); later head football coach of the University of Wisconsin (1970–1977)
- Lenae Fergerson, former WNBA player, playing for the Detroit Shock (2002–2007); played in Europe 2007–2014; currently the department chair of Heath and Physical Education at Fenwick

== Additional information ==
- Koenig, Harry C. (1980). "A History of the Parishes of the Archdiocese". St. Vincent Ferrer Parish. Archived from the original on July 18, 2006.
