= David Brooks (commentator) =

American journalist, commentator, editor (born 1961)

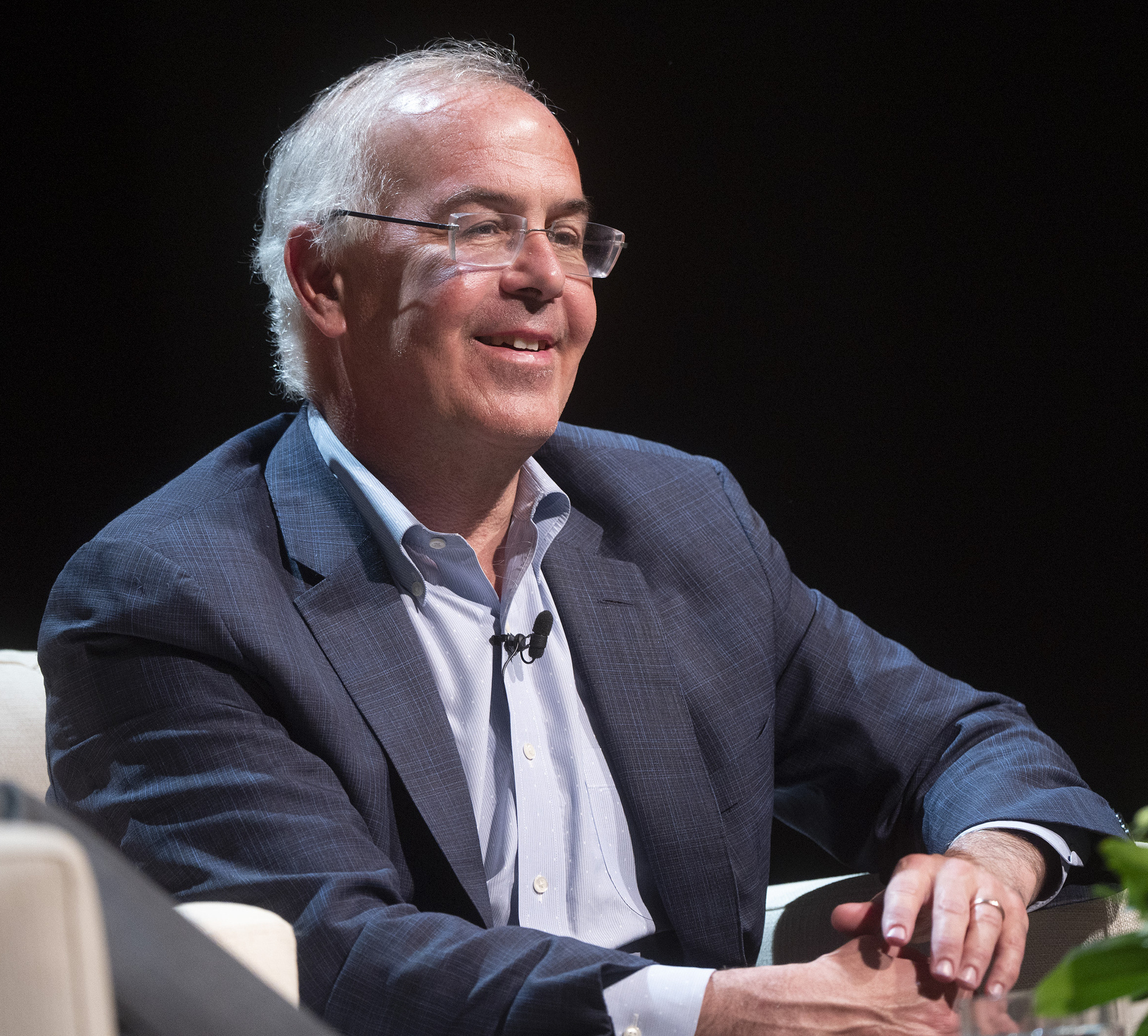
- Brooks in 2022
- Born: August 11, 1961 (age 65); Toronto, Ontario, Canada
- Education: University of Chicago (BA)
- Occupations: Columnist, pundit
- Notable work: Wall Street Journal Opinions writer and editor (1986–1994); The New York Times columnist (2003–2026); PBS NewsHour contributor (since 2001); The Atlantic columnist (since 2026)
- Spouses: Sarah (née Jane Hughes; m. 1986; div. 2013); Anne Snyder (m. 2017)

David Brooks (born August 11, 1961) is a Canadian-born American author and political and cultural commentator. Though he describes himself as a "moderate Republican", others have characterised him as centrist, moderate conservative, or conservative, based on his record as contributor to the PBS NewsHour, and as opinion columnist for The New York Times. In addition to his shorter form writing, Brooks has authored seven non-fiction books since 2000, two appearing from Simon and Schuster, and five from Random House, the latter including The Social Animal: The Hidden Sources of Love, Character, and Achievement (2011), and The Road to Character (2015).

Beginning as a police reporter in Chicago and as an intern at William F. Buckley's National Review, Brooks rose to his positions at The New York Times, NPR, and PBS after a long series of other journalistic positions (film critic for The Washington Times, reporter and op-ed editor at The Wall Street Journal, senior editor at The Weekly Standard, and contributing editor at Newsweek and The Atlantic Monthly).

== Early life and education ==
Brooks was born on August 11, 1961, in Toronto, where his father was working on a PhD at the University of Toronto. Along with his brother, Daniel, David spent his early years living in Stuyvesant Town housing, in New York City. Their father taught English literature at New York University, while their mother studied 19th-century British history at Columbia University. Brooks was raised Jewish, but rarely attended synagogue in adulthood. As a young child, he was enrolled in the Grace Church School, an independent Episcopal primary school in the East Village. When he was 12, his family moved to the well-to-do suburbs of Philadelphia's Main Line area, where he attended Radnor High School, where he competed on the debate team with actor and Back to the Future star Tom F. Wilson. Brooks graduated in 1979 and attended the University of Chicago, where he earned his Bachelor of Arts degree in history. His senior thesis was on popular science writer Robert Ardrey.

As an undergraduate, Brooks frequently contributed reviews and satirical pieces to campus publications. His senior year, he wrote a spoof of the lifestyle of wealthy conservative William F. Buckley Jr., who was scheduled to speak at the university: "In the afternoons he is in the habit of going into crowded rooms and making everybody else feel inferior. The evenings are reserved for extended bouts of name-dropping." To his piece, Brooks appended the note: "Some would say I'm envious of Mr. Buckley. But if truth be known, I just want a job and have a peculiar way of asking. So how about it, Billy? Can you spare a dime?" When Buckley arrived to give his talk, he asked whether Brooks was in the lecture audience and offered him a job.

== Early career ==
Upon graduation, Brooks became a police reporter for the City News Bureau of Chicago, a wire service owned jointly by the Chicago Tribune and Chicago Sun Times. He says that his experience on Chicago's crime beat had a conservatizing influence on him. In 1984, mindful of the offer he had received from Buckley, Brooks applied and was accepted as an intern at Buckley's National Review. According to Christopher Beam, the internship included an all-access pass to the affluent lifestyle that Brooks had previously mocked, including yachting expeditions, Bach concerts, dinners at Buckley's Park Avenue apartment and villa in Stamford, Connecticut, and a constant stream of writers, politicians, and celebrities.

Brooks was an outsider in more ways than his relative inexperience. National Review was a Catholic magazine, and Brooks is not Catholic. Sam Tanenhaus later reported in The New Republic that Buckley might have eventually named Brooks his successor if it hadn't been for his being Jewish. "If true, it would be upsetting," Brooks says.

After his internship with Buckley ended, Brooks spent some time at the conservative Hoover Institution at Stanford University and wrote movie reviews for The Washington Times.

== Career ==
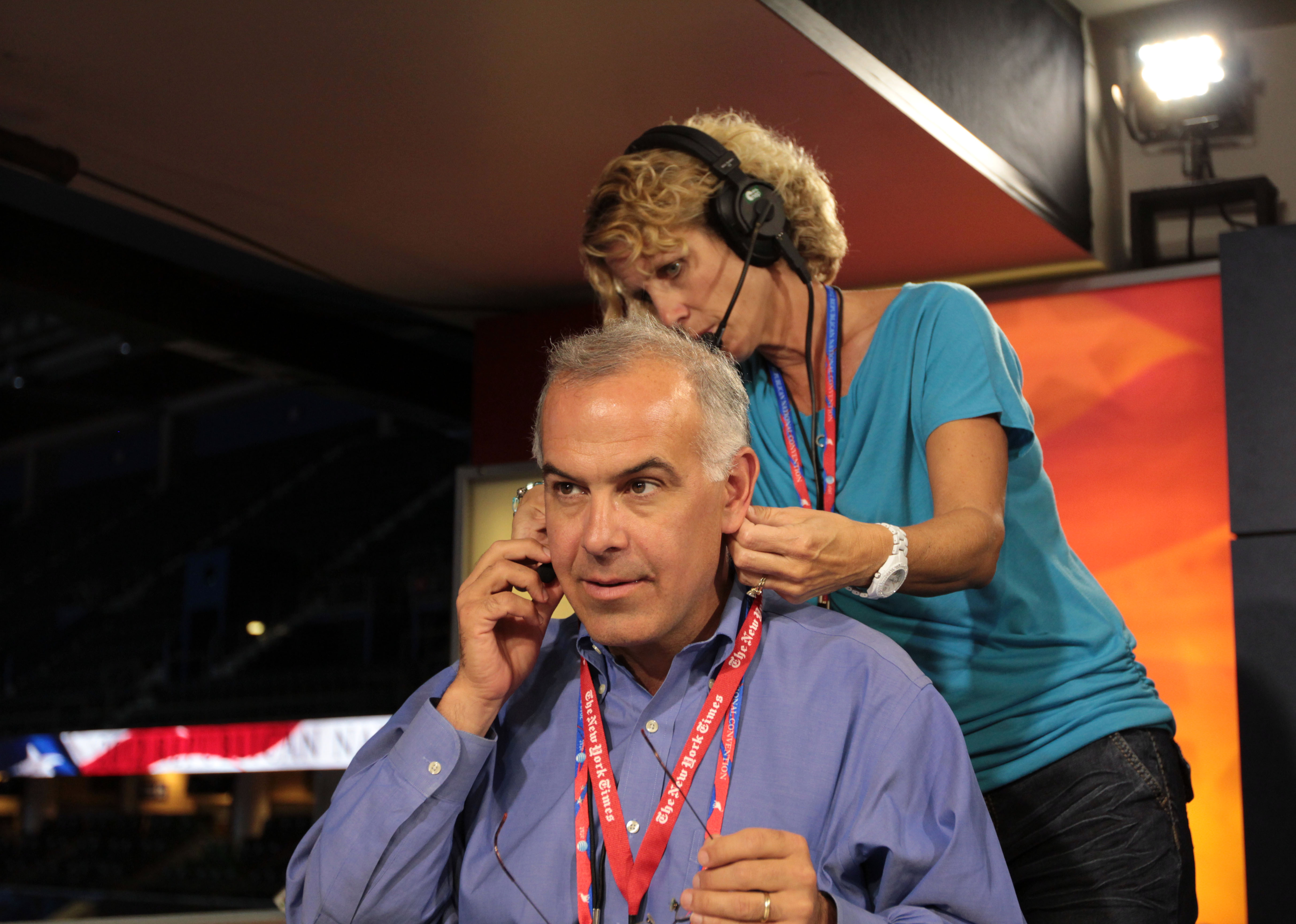
Brooks preparing for PBS Newshour in 2012

In 1986, Brooks was hired by The Wall Street Journal, where he worked first as an editor of the book review section. He also filled in for five months as a movie critic. From 1990 to 1994, the newspaper posted Brooks as an op-ed columnist to Brussels, where he covered Russia (making numerous trips to Moscow), the Middle East, South Africa, and European affairs. On his return, Brooks joined the neo-conservative Weekly Standard when it was launched in 1994. Two years later, he edited an anthology, Backward and Upward: The New Conservative Writing.

External videos
- Booknotes interview with Brooks on Bobos, July 30, 2000, C-SPAN

In 2000, Brooks published a book of cultural commentary titled Bobos in Paradise: The New Upper Class and How They Got There where he argued that the new managerial or "new upper class" represents a marriage between the liberal idealism of the 1960s and the self-interest of the 1980s.

According to a 2010 article in New York Magazine written by Christopher Beam, New York Times editorial-page editor Gail Collins called Brooks in 2003 and invited him to lunch.

Collins was looking for a conservative to replace outgoing columnist William Safire, but one who understood how liberals think. "I was looking for the kind of conservative writer that wouldn't make our readers shriek and throw the paper out the window," says Collins. "He was perfect." Brooks started writing in September 2003. "The first six months were miserable," Brooks says. "I'd never been hated on a mass scale before."

One column written by Brooks in The New York Times, which dismissed the conviction of Scooter Libby as being "a farce" and having "no significance", was derided by political blogger Andrew Sullivan.

In 2004, Brooks's book On Paradise Drive: How We Live Now (And Always Have) in the Future Tense was published as a sequel to his 2000 best seller, Bobos in Paradise, but it was not as well received as its predecessor. Brooks is also the volume editor of The Best American Essays (publication date October 2, 2012), and authored The Social Animal: The Hidden Sources of Love, Character and Achievement. The book was excerpted in The New Yorker in January 2011 and received mixed reviews upon its full publication in March of that year. It sold well and reached #3 on the Publishers Weekly best-sellers list for non-fiction in April 2011.

Brooks was a visiting professor of public policy at Duke University's Terry Sanford Institute of Public Policy, and taught an undergraduate seminar there in the fall of 2006. In 2013, he taught a course at Yale University on philosophical humility.

In 2012, Brooks was elected to the University of Chicago Board of Trustees. He also serves on the board of advisors for the University of Chicago Institute of Politics.

In 2019, Brooks gave a TED talk in Vancouver entitled "The Lies Our Culture Tells Us About What Matters – And a Better Way to Live". TED curator Chris Anderson selected it as one of his favourite talks of 2019.

In 2026, Brooks left The New York Times, joining The Atlantic and becoming a fellow at the Yale Jackson School of Global Affairs.

== Political ideology ==
Ideologically, Brooks has been described as a centrist, a conservative, and a moderate conservative. Brooks has described himself as a former democratic socialist and "a Burkean... [which] is to be a moderate", saying that such was "what I think I’ve become". He said in a 2017 interview that "[one] of [his] callings is to represent a certain moderate Republican Whig political philosophy." In December 2021, he wrote that he placed himself "on the rightward edge of the leftward tendency—in the more promising soil of the moderate wing of the Democratic Party". In 2024, he said he finds himself "rooting for the Democrats about 70 percent of the time" and that he was "almost all the way to joining" the Democratic Party. Ottawa Citizen conservative commentator David Warren has identified Brooks as a "sophisticated pundit"; one of "those Republicans who want to 'engage with' the liberal agenda". When asked what he thinks of charges that he's "not a real conservative" or "squishy", Brooks has said that "if you define conservative by support for the Republican candidate or the belief that tax cuts are the correct answer to all problems, I guess I don't fit that agenda. But I do think that I'm part of a long-standing conservative tradition that has to do with Edmund Burke ... and Alexander Hamilton." In fact, Brooks read Burke's work while he was an undergraduate at the University of Chicago and "completely despised it", but "gradually over the next five to seven years ... came to agree with him". Brooks writes that "my visceral hatred was because he touched something I didn't like or know about myself." In September 2012, Brooks talked about being criticized from the conservative side, saying, "If it's from a loon, I don't mind it. I get a kick out of it. If it's Michelle Malkin attacking, I don't mind it." With respect to whether he was "the liberals' favorite conservative" Brooks said he "didn't care", stating: "I don't mind liberals praising me, but when it's the really partisan liberals, you get an avalanche of love, it's like uhhh, I gotta rethink this."

Brooks describes himself as beginning as a liberal before, as he put it, "coming to my senses." He recounts that a turning point in his thinking came while he was still an undergraduate when he was selected to present the socialist point of view during a televised debate with Nobel laureate free-market economist Milton Friedman. As Brooks describes it, "[It] was essentially me making a point, and he making a two-sentence rebuttal which totally devastated my point. ... That didn't immediately turn me into a conservative, but ..." On August 10, 2006, Brooks wrote a column for The New York Times titled "Party No. 3". The column imagined a moderate McCain-Lieberman Party in opposition to both major parties, which he perceived as both polarized and beholden to special interests.

In a March 2007 article published in The New York Times titled "No U-Turns", Brooks explained that the Republican Party must distance itself from the minimal-government conservative principles that had arisen during the Barry Goldwater and Ronald Reagan eras. He wrote that these core concepts had served their purposes and should no longer be embraced by Republicans in order to win elections. Alex Pareene commented that Brooks "has been trying for so long to imagine a sensible Republican Party into existence that he can't still think it's going to happen soon."

=== Iraq war ===
Before the 2003 invasion of Iraq, Brooks argued for American military intervention, echoing the belief of commentators and political figures that American and British forces would be welcomed as liberators. In 2005, Brooks wrote what columnist Jonathan Chait described as "a witheringly condescending" column portraying Senator Harry Reid as an "unhinged conspiracy theorist because he accused the George W. Bush administration of falsifying its Iraq intelligence." By 2008, five years into the war, Brooks maintained that the decision to go to war was correct, but that Secretary of Defense Donald Rumsfeld had botched U.S. war efforts.

In 2015, Brooks wrote that "[f]rom the current vantage point, the decision to go to war was a clear misjudgment" made in 2003 by President George W. Bush and the majority of Americans who supported the war, including Brooks himself. Brooks wrote "many of us thought that, by taking down Saddam Hussein, we could end another evil empire, and gradually open up human development in Iraq and the Arab world. Has that happened? In 2004, I would have said yes. In 2006, I would have said no. In 2015, I say yes and no, but mostly no." Citing the Robb-Silberman report, Brooks rejected as a "fable" the idea that "intelligence about Iraqi weapons of mass destruction was all cooked by political pressure, that there was a big political conspiracy to lie us into war." Instead, Brooks viewed the war as a product of faulty intelligence, writing that "[t]he Iraq war error reminds us of the need for epistemological modesty."

=== Presidential elections and candidates ===
Brooks on PBS Newshour on 29 April 2016 discussing the leading candidates for the 2016 US presidential election

Brooks was long a supporter of John McCain; however, he disliked McCain's 2008 running mate, Sarah Palin, calling her a "cancer" on the Republican Party, and citing her as the reason he voted for Obama in the 2008 presidential election. He has referred to Palin as a "joke", unlikely ever to win the Republican nomination. But he later admitted during a C-SPAN interview that he had gone too far in his previous "cancer" comments about Palin, which he regretted, and simply stated he was not a fan of her values.

Brooks has frequently expressed admiration for President Barack Obama. In an August 2009 profile of Brooks, The New Republic describes his first encounter with Obama in the spring of 2005: "Usually when I talk to senators, while they may know a policy area better than me, they generally don't know political philosophy better than me. I got the sense he knew both better than me...I remember distinctly an image of—we were sitting on his couches, and I was looking at his pant leg and his perfectly creased pant, and I'm thinking, (a) he's going to be president and (b) he'll be a very good president." Brooks appreciates that Obama thinks "like a writer", explaining, "He's a very writerly personality, a little aloof, exasperated. He's calm. He's not addicted to people." Two days after Obama's second autobiography, The Audacity of Hope, hit bookstores, Brooks published a column in The New York Times, titled "Run, Barack, Run", urging the Chicago politician to run for president. However, in December 2011, during a C-SPAN interview, Brooks expressed a more tempered opinion of Obama's presidency, giving Obama only a "B−" and saying that Obama's chances of re-election would be less than 50–50 if elections were held at that time. He stated, "I don't think he's integrated himself with people in Washington as much as he should have." However, in a February 2016 New York Times op-ed, Brooks admitted that he missed Obama during the 2016 primary season, admiring the president's "integrity" and "humanity", among other characteristics.

Regarding the 2016 election, Brooks spoke in support of Hillary Clinton, applauding her ability to be "competent" and "normal" in comparison to her Republican counterpart, Donald Trump. In addition, Brooks noted that he believed Clinton would eventually be victorious in the election, as he foresaw that the general American public would become "sick of" Trump.

When discussing the political emergence of Trump, Brooks strongly critiqued the candidate, most notably by authoring a New York Times op-ed he titled "No, Not Trump, Not Ever." In this piece, Brooks attacked Trump by arguing he is "epically unprepared to be president" and pointing out Trump's "steady obliviousness to accuracy."

On the August 9, 2019, episode of the PBS NewsHour, Brooks suggested Trump may be a sociopath.

=== Israel ===
Brooks has expressed admiration for Israel and has visited almost every year since 1991. He supported Israel during the 2014 Gaza War.

In writing for The New York Times in January 2010, Brooks described Israel as "an astonishing success story". He wrote that "Jews are a famously accomplished group", who, because they were "forced to give up farming in the Middle Ages ... have been living off their wits ever since". In Brooks' view, "Israel's technological success is the fruition of the Zionist dream. The country was not founded so stray settlers could sit among thousands of angry Palestinians in Hebron. It was founded so Jews would have a safe place to come together and create things for the world."

Brooks has supported Israel during the Gaza war and has emphasized that Hamas and Hezbollah must be "degraded". Despite his support for Israel he has also been critical of Benjamin Netanyahu and described the Israel Defense Forces actions in Gaza as "uncivilized" and "barbaric".

== Social views ==
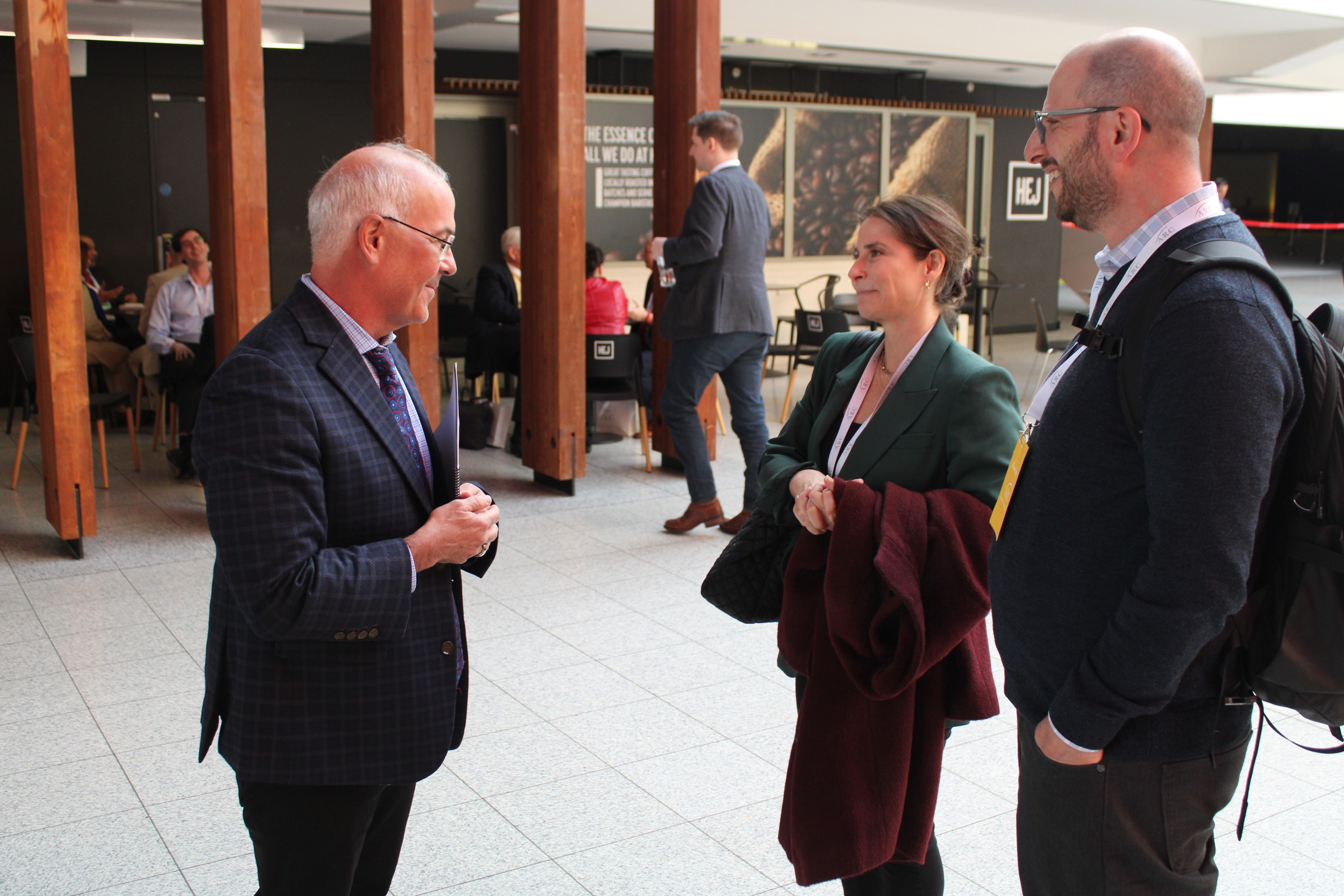
Brooks speaking with fans at the Alliance for Responsible Citizenship, London, 2025

Brooks opposes what he sees as self-destructive behavior, such as the prevalence of teenage sex and divorce. His view is that "sex is more explicit everywhere barring real life. As the entertainment media have become more sex-saturated, American teenagers have become more sexually abstemious" by "waiting longer to have sex ... [and] having fewer partners". In 2007, Brooks stated that he sees the culture war as nearly over, because "today's young people ... seem happy with the frankness of the left and the wholesomeness of the right." As a result, he was optimistic about the United States' social stability, which he considered to be "in the middle of an amazing moment of improvement and repair".

As early as 2003, Brooks wrote favorably of same-sex marriage, pointing out that marriage is a traditional conservative value. Rather than opposing it, he wrote: "We should insist on gay marriage. We should regard it as scandalous that two people could claim to love each other and not want to sanctify their love with marriage and fidelity ... It's going to be up to conservatives to make the important, moral case for marriage, including gay marriage."

In 2015, Brooks issued his commentary on poverty reform in the United States. His op-ed in The New York Times titled "The Nature of Poverty" specifically followed the social uproar caused by the death of Freddie Gray, and concluded that federal spending is not the issue impeding the progress of poverty reforms, but rather that the impediments to upward mobility are "matters of social psychology". When discussing Gray in particular, Brooks claimed that Gray as a young man was "not on the path to upward mobility".

In 2020, Brooks wrote in The Atlantic, under the headline "The Nuclear Family Was a Mistake", that "recent signs suggest at least the possibility that a new family paradigm is emerging," suggesting that in the place of the "collapsed" nuclear one the "extended" family emerges, with "multigenerational living arrangements" that stretch even "across kinship lines". Brooks had already started in 2017 a project called "Weave", in order, as he described it, to "support and draw attention to people and organizations around the country who are building community" and to "repair [America]'s social fabric, which is badly frayed by distrust, division and exclusion."

Brooks also takes a moderate position on abortion, which he thinks should be legal, but with parental consent for minors, during the first four or five months, and illegal afterward, except in extremely rare circumstances.

He has expressed opposition to the legalization of marijuana, stating that use of the drug causes immoral behavior. Brooks relates that he smoked it in his youth but quit after a humiliating incident: Brooks smoked marijuana during lunch hour at school and felt embarrassed during a class presentation that afternoon in which he says he was incapable of intelligible speech.

== Criticism ==
=== Books ===
In reviewing On Paradise Drive (2004), Michael Kinsley described Brooks' "sociological method" as having "four components: fearless generalizing, clever coinage, jokes and shopping lists." Taking umbrage with the first of these, Kinsley states, "Brooks does not let the sociology get in the way of the shtick, and he wields a mean shoehorn when he needs the theory to fit the joke". This followed the 2004 Philadelphia magazine fact-checking of Bobos in Paradise by Sasha Issenberg that concluded many of its comments about middle America were misleading or untrue. Kinsley reported that "Brooks defend[ed] his generalizations as poetic hyperbole". Issenberg likewise noted that Brooks insisted that the book was not intended to be factual but rather to report impressions of what he believed an area to be like: "He laughed" that the book was "'partially tongue-in-cheek'". Issenberg continues, "I went through some of the other instances where he made declarations that appeared insupportable. He accused me of being 'too pedantic,' of 'taking all of this too literally,' of 'taking a joke and distorting it.' 'That's totally unethical', he said."

In 2015, David Zweig expressed the opinion in a Salon piece that Brooks had gotten "nearly every detail" wrong about a poll of high school students in his book, The Road to Character.

=== Articles ===
In March 2012, Dan Abrams of ABC News, and then Brooks, were criticized by Lyle Denniston with regard to the U.S. Supreme Court's 2010 decision in Citizens United v. Federal Election Commission, where alongside the claim that Brooks had "scrambled the actual significance of what the Supreme Court has done", he goes on to state that "[t]here is a link, but it is only indirect, between the Court’s 2010 decision... and the rise of Super PACs" [emphasis added].

Writing in response to Brooks 2015 opinion in The New York Times, "The New Old Liberalism", Tom Scocca of Gawker, after stating that Brooks was "a dumb partisan hack", went on to state that Brooks "perceived facts and statistics as an opportunity for dishonest people to work mischief", and so did not use them to support his policy positions. Annie Lowrey, responding to Brooks' opinion, "The Nature of Poverty", on May 1, 2015, in New York magazine, criticized Brooks' basis for his argument for political reform, claiming he used "some very tricksy, misleading math". Sean Illing of Slate criticized the same article, claiming Brooks took arguments out of context and routinely made bold "half-right" assumptions regarding the controversial issue of poverty reform.

In 2016, Brooks' analyzed the U.S. Supreme Court's decision in Dretke v. Haley, leading James Taranto to the critique that "Brooks's treatment of this case is either deliberately deceptive or recklessly ignorant". In a self-published blog, law professor Ann Althouse argued that in the piece, Brooks "distorts rather grotesquely" by exaggerating the character of then-Texas solicitor general Ted Cruz (who brought the case to the high court).

=== Other media ===
In 2023, Brooks was criticised online following a tweet presented as misleading that claimed an airport hamburger meal had cost $78, and that the exorbitant cost of hamburgers was the reason Americans were dissatisfied with the economy; his critics pointed out that Brooks' high restaurant bill was the result of his ordering multiple scotches along with his meal.

== Legacy ==
=== Sidney Awards ===
In 2004, Brooks created an award to honor the year's best political and cultural journalism. Named for philosopher Sidney Hook and originally called "The Hookies", the honor was renamed "The Sidney Awards" in 2005. The awards are presented each December.

== Personal life ==
=== Relationships ===
Brooks met his first wife Jane Hughes while both attended the University of Chicago. They married in 1986 and she converted to Judaism and changed her given name to Sarah. They divorced in November 2013. Their eldest son, as revealed by Brooks in an interview for Israeli newspaper Haaretz, volunteered at age 23 to serve in the Israel Defense Forces in 2014.

Brooks married Anne Snyder in 2017, having met while she was his research assistant as he wrote The Road to Character. At the time of their wedding, he was 55 and she was 32. Snyder, who holds degrees from Wheaton College (B.A. international relations and philosophy, 2007) and Georgetown University (M.A. journalism), is the editor-in-chief of Comment and the author of the 2019 book The Fabric of Character: A Wise Giver's Guide to Renewing our Social and Moral Landscape.

=== Religion ===
Brooks converted to Christianity from Judaism between 2013 and 2014. He describes what he calls "numinous experiences", including one in a crowded subway car:

I looked around the car, and I had this shimmering awareness that all the people in it had souls. Each of them had some piece of themselves that had no size, color, weight or shape but that gave them infinite value.

Brooks still maintained a strong attachment to Judaism, explaining, "Today, I feel more Jewish than ever, but as I once told some friends, I can't unread Matthew." He has described himself as "enchanted by both Judaism and Christianity, while acknowledging that his acceptance of both the Old and New Testaments makes him a Christian.

=== Epstein files ===
On November 21, 2025, Brooks published a column in the New York Times dismissing the Epstein files as a QAnon-related conspiracy. On December 18, photos released by the House Oversight Committee revealed that Brooks had attended a dinner at which Jeffrey Epstein was also present in 2011, which he did not disclose in his article. A spokesperson responded to inquiries, claiming that Brooks "regularly attends events [as a journalist] to speak with noted and important business leaders to inform his columns [and] had no contact with [Epstein] before or after this single attendance at a widely-attended dinner".

== Select bibliography ==
- Editor, Backward and Upward: The New Conservative Writing (Vintage, 1996) 0-6797-6654-5
- Bobos in Paradise: The New Upper Class and How They Got There (2000) ISBN 0-684-85377-9
- On Paradise Drive: How We Live Now (And Always Have) in the Future Tense (2004) ISBN 0-7432-2738-7
- The Social Animal: The Hidden Sources of Love, Character, and Achievement (2011) ISBN 978-1-4000-6760-2
- The Road to Character (Random House, 2015) ISBN 978-0-8129-9325-7
- The Second Mountain: The Quest for a Moral Life (Random House, 2019) ISBN 978-0-8-1299-3264
- How to Know a Person (Random House, 2023) ISBN 978-0-5932-3006-0

== See also ==
- Co-commentator on NPR: E. J. Dionne.
- Co-commentator on the PBS Newshour: Jonathan Capehart
