= Chicago Daily Law Bulletin =

Newspaper in Chicago, Illinois, US

- The May 30, 2019 front page of CDLB
- Type: daily newspaper legal periodical
- Format: Tabloid
- Owner: Law Bulletin Media
- Founder: Edwin Bean
- Founded: October 27, 1854; 172 years ago.
- Headquarters: 415 N. State St. Chicago, Illinois, United States
- Sister newspapers: Chicago Lawyer, Chicago Law Journal, Akron Legal News, Portage County Legal News (Ravenna, Ohio), Daily Legal News (Youngstown, Ohio)
- ISSN: 0362-6148
- Website: www.chicagolawbulletin.com

The Chicago Daily Law Bulletin (CDLB) is a daily newspaper in Chicago, Illinois, that covers the region's local court systems and the legal community. Founded in 1854, it is the oldest daily court newspaper in the United States.

== Content ==
Published every weekday afternoon aside from a few national holidays, CDLB features original reporting on legal decisions, verdicts and settlements from the Circuit Court of Cook County, the Illinois Appellate Court, the Supreme Court of Illinois, the United States District Court for the Northern District of Illinois and the United States Court of Appeals for the Seventh Circuit. Additionally, the paper covers Illinois-practicing attorneys, local law firms, Illinois' nine law schools and the Illinois General Assembly.

The newspaper places reporters full-time at the Everett McKinley Dirksen United States Courthouse and the Richard J. Daley Center in Chicago, and the Illinois State Capitol in Springfield, Illinois.

Trial Notebook

Since 2002, the front page of every CDLB edition has included Chicago attorney Steven Garmisa's "Trial Notebook" column highlighting key legal points from recent state or federal appellate opinions. Garmisa is the fourth attorney to hold the daily columnist role. His predecessor, Theodore Postel, wrote his daily column for almost 30 years.

Lawyers' Forum

The Daily Law Bulletin does not have an editorial board and does not publish staff-written opinion pieces. The "Lawyers' Forum" space publishes pieces submitted by Illinois attorneys that offer "their expertise and insight," under the publication's submission guidelines.

== History ==
=== Origins ===
The Law Bulletin began publication in 1854 as the Daily Report of Suits, Judgments, Chattel Mortgages, etc., founded by Chicago attorney Edwin Bean. It was the first daily court publication, coming about 11 years after The Legal Intelligencer pioneered the concept in Philadelphia with a weekly newspaper.

At the start, the publication fit onto a single 8-by-12 inch page. In 1862, Bean sold the paper to R.R. Stevens, who changed the name of the publication to the Chicago Daily Law Record in 1867.

The paper stopped production for two weeks in October 1871 as a result of the Great Chicago Fire, which destroyed the newspaper's downtown Chicago office. The period was the only stretch of inactivity in the publication's history.

The November 7, 1873 front page of the Law Bulletin.

In 1873, Stevens and publisher Alfred M. Smith renamed the paper as the Daily Law Bulletin.

=== Macfarland family ownership ===
In 1879, the company was sold to Henry Janes Macfarland Sr., whose family has owned the company since. The Macfarlands were among Chicago's first families, relocating from Massachusetts to manufacture shoes. H.J. Macfarland was a charter member of the Commercial Club of Chicago.

Macfarland's son, Henry J. Macfarland Jr., inherited the business from his father and ran it until his sudden death at age 55 in 1951. Lanning Macfarland, Henry Jr.'s brother, stepped into the leadership role.

In 1953, Lanning Macfarland's son Lanning Macfarland Jr. joined the business, after earning his MBA at Northwestern University. At the time, the business was struggling, facing competition in Chicago from the weekly National Corporation Reporter. By that time, the Law Bulletin was a broadsheet newspaper with editorial content.

=== Expansion of Law Bulletin Publishing Co. ===
Lanning Macfarland Jr. took over as CEO upon his father's death in 1971. Over his tenure, Law Bulletin Publishing Co. expanded beyond the newspaper into other legal and real estate services.

In addition to developing an electronic case management system in the mid-1980s, the company acquired other publications, including Sullivan's Law Directory, Leading Lawyers and the Jury Verdict Reporter.

In 1988, Macfarland hired veteran Chicago journalist Bernard M. Judge as the newspaper's editor and publisher. The editorial staff was expanded under Judge's watch.

In 1989, the Law Bulletin acquired Chicago Lawyer from legal journalist Rob Warden and repurposed the brand into a monthly sister publication to the daily newspaper.

Law Bulletin Publishing Company rebranded as Law Bulletin Media in 2017. In April 2019, the paper was redesigned in a tabloid-size format and began printing in color.
