= Elizabeth Austin (writer) =

American journalist

Elizabeth Austin (born 1958) is an American writer living in Oak Park, Illinois. Austin has lived in the Midwestern United States all her life. She began her journalism career at the now-defunct City News Bureau of Chicago and has written articles for national news magazines such as Newsweek and Time, in addition to a wide range of other national and regional publications, such as People, and the Chicago Tribune. She has also written for The Washington Monthly, Ladies Home Journal, Good Housekeeping, Self, and Shape. She has often written about medicine and health care. Austin also has been heard on WBEZ, the National Public Radio station in Chicago, as well as the BBC in the UK and Scotland. She has appeared on the Today Show and on ITV in Europe.

Austin was co-author of a syndicated Knight-Ridder column, leaving that job in 2004 to join the staff of Illinois Governor Rod Blagojevich, and went on to serve as Communications Director for Illinois Lt. Governor Pat Quinn. After serving a year as Vice President for Corporate Communications at Playboy Enterprises, she returned to Illinois state government as Communications Director for the Governor's Office of Management and Budget. She later served as Communications Director for Governor Quinn's 2010 primary campaign.

She has stated “I believe in a God who is the Way, the Life and the Truth. Deliberately misleading others—even in fun—smacks of heresy.” She said this in an article complaining about some Wikipedia editors’ cleaning up unflattering references to themselves, or vandalizing articles about others in jest, sometimes called "Wikiality". However, this was one line from one article out of the thousands that she has written throughout her career, and should not be considered as her life philosophy or even as the most salient quote from her body of work.

Austin won the 1996 National Mental Health Association Award for Best Magazine Journalism.

She is an Episcopalian and has written about religious issues. She has been a Girl Scout leader.

== Books ==
- The Good Girl's Guide to Negotiating; How to Get What You Want at the Bargaining Table with Leslie Whitaker (ISBN 0-316-60105-5).
