= The Social Animal (Brooks book) =

2011 book by David Brooks

- Hardcover version cover
- Author: David Brooks
- Language: English
- Subject: Sociology, Psychology, Biology
- Published: March 8, 2011 Random House
- Publication place: United States
- Pages: 448
- ISBN: 1-4000-6760-X
- Preceded by: On Paradise Drive: How We Live Now (And Always Have) in the Future Tense
- Followed by: The Road to Character

The Social Animal: The Hidden Sources of Love, Character, and Achievement is a non-fiction book by American journalist David Brooks, who is otherwise best known for his career with The New York Times. The book discusses what drives individual behavior and decision making. Brooks goes through various academic topics such as sociology, psychology, and biology and attempts to summarize various discoveries—such as brain development in early life. The book continually refers to two fictional characters 'Harold' and 'Erica', used by Brooks as examples of how people's emotional personality changes over time.

The book debuted at No. 1 on the New York Times bestseller list. It reached the No. 3 spot on the Publishers Weekly best-sellers list for non-fiction (as of April 3, 2011). The book has received a wide variety of reviews. Criticism came from Forbes.com, Salon.com, and The New York Times Book Review, while praise came from The Washington Times, Newsweek, and Kirkus Reviews. The book is a favorite of the former British Prime Minister and Conservative Party leader, David Cameron.

== Background ==
Brooks spent close to three years writing the book in between moments of his media career, such as TV appearances and lectures. He has remarked, "I used to play golf... I gave up every second that I wasn't hanging around with my wife and kids." In doing research, he visited the lab of neuro-scientist Antonio Damasio at the University of Southern California (USC).

Brooks's distance from his friends and colleagues living in Washington, D.C., which he has called "the most emotionally avoidant city in America", provided a major inspiration for writing the book. He has also remarked, "Our explanation of why we live the way we do is all on the surface... Our policies have been shaped by shallow views of human nature."

== Contents ==
Brooks writes that people's subconscious minds largely determine who they are and how they behave. He argues that deep internal emotions, the "mental sensations that happen to us", establish the outward mindset that makes decisions such as career choices. Brooks describes the human brain as dependent on what he calls "scouts" running through a deeply complex neuronal network.

Ultimately, Brooks depicts human beings as driven by the universal feelings of loneliness and the need to belong—what he labels "the urge to merge". He describes people going through "the loneliness loop" of internal isolation, engagement, and then isolation again. He states that people feel the continual need to be understood by others.

Brooks devises two fictional characters, Harold and Erica, that he follows from around conception to natural death. Harold goes through life with a somewhat passive, pedestrian attitude as an intelligent student, a historical-themed author, and later as a fellow at a Washington, D.C. think tank. Erica has a more focused and driven attitude that leads her to overcome the failure of her start-up consulting business to become the CEO of a major cable corporation and eventually ascend to the position of (fictional) President Richard Grace's Deputy Chief of Staff and then Commerce Secretary.

== Reviews ==
On the weekend of the book's publication, The New York Times Book Review published a review written by philosophy and law professor Thomas Nagel. Nagel criticized Brooks's use of fictional characters in pursuit of his central thesis, writing,

The book is really a moral and social tract, but Brooks has hung it on the life stories of two imaginary people, Harold and Erica, who are used to illustrate his theory in detail and to provide the occasion for countless references to the psychological literature and frequent disquisitions on human nature and society... This device is supposed to relieve the tedium of what would otherwise be like skimming through 10 years' worth of the Tuesday Science Times. But fiction is not Brooks's métier, and he lacks the ability to create characters that compel belief.

The Washington Times published a positive review. Critic Claude R. Marx labeled it "a well-written and engaging tour d'horizon". He also commented that "the book's effectiveness is at times diminished by the author's glibness, selective use of evidence and insufficient attention to opposing viewpoints." He concluded that readers "will learn a great deal".

In Salon.com, science writer PZ Myers criticized the fictional literary narrative technique, calling the book an "arid wasteland", but he principally criticized what he called the scientific deficiencies,

The technicalities don't illuminate the story in any way, and the story undercuts the science. Ultimately, the neuroscience in the book feels a micrometer deep and a boring lifetime long, with the fiction of Harold and Erica giving the impression that it's built on a sample size of two, and both of them utterly imaginary... I don't know whom this book is really written for. It's definitely not going to satisfy any scientists, or even any informed people who want to know more about how the brain works— there's no technical meat on the bones of this farce. It's certainly not going to satisfy anyone hoping for literary quality, or beauty and poetry, or even a good story. I suspect that its only virtue is in uniting C. P. Snow's two cultures, both of which will be populated with peeved readers flinging the book with great force across rooms everywhere.

Will Wilkinson wrote for Forbes.com what he labeled from the beginning as "A Scornful Review". He praised Brooks' "laudably ambitious aim" but found the follow-up disappointing. Wilkinson called the book's characters "two boring people who lead muted, more or less satisfactory lives in the successful pursuit of achievement as it is narrowly defined by their culture... emotionally straitened, humorlessly striving".

Newsweek ran a review by James Atlas praising the book as "authoritative, impressively learned, and vast in scope", and he also remarked:

Brooks has absorbed and synthesized a tremendous amount of scholarship. He has mastered the literature on childhood development, sociology, and neuro-science; the classics of modern sociology; the major philosophers from the Greeks to the French philosophes; the economists from Adam Smith to Robert Schiller. He quotes artfully from Coleridge and Stendhal. And there’s nothing showy about it.

Alan Wolfe wrote a mixed review in The New Republic. He stated that Brooks is a "skillful popularizer of academic research in a wide variety of fields" and that Brooks "has a knack... to find experiments that, in his view, are chock full of revelations about the ways we live now." Wolfe also accused Brooks of cherry-picking facts to suit a given narrative about human nature. Wolf described The Social Animal as "a book by a conservative in which science is being used to buttress a prior point of view."

Walter Isaacson, author and CEO of the Aspen Institute, praised the book as "an absolutely fascinating book about how we form our emotions and character." Kirkus Reviews referred to it as "An uncommonly brilliant blend of sociology, intellect and allegory."

Tony Schwartz praised The Social Animal in the Harvard Business Review, finding in it "a path to a more meaningful life—one that balances action with introspection, confidence with restraint."

== Reception ==
The book reached the No. 3 spot on the Publishers Weekly best-sellers list for non-fiction (as of April 3, 2011). It debuted at No. 1 on the New York Times bestseller list. It also reached the Amazon.com Bestsellers Rank of No. 35 in the general category 'Books' (as of April 12). Brooks told Newsweek that he felt surprised by the large audience interest in his book tour, such as a woman screaming "Will you marry me?" in Aspen Institute as well as people at Random House hugging him in their office corridors.

Brooks appeared on the Comedy Central program The Colbert Report on March 9 to promote the book.

The book made a deep impression upon the British Prime Minister and Conservative Party leader at the time, David Cameron. Cameron instructed all members of his Cabinet to read the book. He created a seminar at 10 Downing Street so that Brooks, while promoting the book in the UK, could speak directly to the Minister and his closest advisers. Cameron's media advisers in particular felt impressed by Brooks's discussions with them.

== See also ==
- 2011 in literature
- Bobos in Paradise
- Descartes' Error: Emotion, Reason, and the Human Brain
