= The Road to Character =

2015 book by David Brooks

- Hardcover version cover
- Author: David Brooks
- Language: English
- Subject: Morality, Ethics
- Published: April 21, 2015 Random House
- Publication place: United States
- Pages: 320
- ISBN: 978-0-8129-9325-7
- Preceded by: The Social Animal

The Road to Character is the fourth book written by journalist David Brooks. Brooks taught an undergraduate course at Yale University for three years during the 2010s on humility, the subject of this book.

Published in 2015, the author says, "I wrote it, to be honest, to save my own soul." According to The Guardian, Brooks decided that he had spent "...too much time cultivating what he calls 'the résumé virtues' – racking up impressive accomplishments – and too little on 'the eulogy virtues', the character strengths for which we'd like to be remembered."

== Outline ==
Brooks begins with Adam I and Adam II, two contradictory sides of human nature described in The Lonely Man of Faith by Rabbi Joseph Soloveitchik. Adam I is the external, career-driven, ambitious side, which Brooks calls the "résumé" self. The subject of this book, Adam II, is internal, humble and the "eulogy" self, the one who “wants to have a serene inner character.”

The bulk of the book is eight chapters of biographical sketches. Loosely one per chapter they are: Frances Perkins, Dwight D. Eisenhower with a page or two devoted to redefining sin for contemporary times, Dorothy Day, George Marshall, A. Philip Randolph and Bayard Rustin who organized the March on Washington, the novelist George Eliot and her mate George Lewes, Augustine and his mother Monica, Samuel Johnson and Michel de Montaigne, winding up with sketches of Johnny Unitas and Joe Namath. Each chapter describes the personal weaknesses that the individual overcame.

Brooks concludes with fifteen numbered points, a sort of CliffsNotes for those who would like the "condensed message of this book."

== Reception ==
Brooks received positive reviews from The New York Times Book Review, Washingtonian, Booklist, and Publishers Weekly. The book received a very negative review from The Guardian that states that "David Brooks's quest to discover the fundamentals of good character gets hopelessly lost along the way".
