= Neal Samors =

American author

Neal Samors is an American author.

Samors has authored, co-authored and/or published forty-one books about Chicago's neighborhoods, politics, downtown, Michigan Avenue, the Chicago River, Lake Shore Drive, and Chicago's airports, and in addition has written and published nostalgic books about growing up in Chicago in the eras of the 1930s, 1940s, 1950s, and 1960s. His first book which he co-authored with Mary Jo Doyle, Michael Williams and Martin Lewin was "An Illustrated History of Rogers Park and West Ridge" that was published by the Rogers Park/West Ridge Historical Society in 2000 and that was followed by a book he co-authored with Michael Williams titled "Rogers Park and West Ridge in the 20th Century" that was published in 2001. Both books won awards from the Illinois State Historical Society. His next book, co-authored with Michael Williams, The Old Chicago Neighborhood: Remembering Chicago in the 1940s, won the 2003 Independent Publisher Book Award first place award in history, in 2006, he was the publisher of "End of Watch: "Chicago Police Killed in the Line of Duty, 1853-2006" by Edward M. Burke and Thomas J. O'Gorman his book." In 2006 he was also the author and publisher of Chicago in the Sixties: Remembering a Time of Change that won the 2007 Independent Publisher Book first place award in history, his book, Downtown Chicago in Transition, co-authored with Eric Bronsky, won the 2008 Independent Publisher Book second place award for Midwest Region books, and his book, "The Rise of The Magnificent Mile," (co-authored with Eric Bronsky), won the 2009 Independent Publisher Book first place award in the Great Lakes region. He co-authored and published three new books in 2008, including Clark Weber's Rock and Roll Radio, by Clark Weber, Never Put Ketchup On A Hot Dog, by Bob Schwartz, and The Rise of the Magnificent Mile, co-authored with Eric Bronsky. In 2010, he published and/or co-authored, with Tony Macaluso and Julia S. Bachrach, "Sounds of Chicago's Lakefront: A Celebration of the Grant Park Music Festival, "A Kid From The Windy City," co-authored by Lee B. Stern and Neal Samors, and "Paths Through The Wilderness: American Indian Trail Marker Trees" by Dennis Downes, with Neal Samors. Next, he was the publisher and co-author with Bernard Judge of "Chicago's Lake Shore Drive: Urban America's Most Beautiful Roadway" and served as publisher of "Chicago From The Sky: A Region Transformed" by Lawrence Okrent. In 2011, he published and co-authored, "Chicago's Classic Restaurants: Past, Present and Future" with Eric Bronsky and Robert Dauber, in 2013 he published and co-authored "Chicago's River At Work And At Play" with Steven Dahlman, in 2015, he published and co-authored "Now Arriving: Traveling To And From Chicago By Air, 90 Years of Flight" with Christopher Lynch, in 2017, he published and co-authored "Changing Chicago: A Portrait in Postcards and Photos" with Steven Dahlman, in 2019, he published and co-authored "Entertaining Chicago: Remembering the Places, Performers and Stories Throughout the 20th Century" with Bob Dauber, won the 2020 Independent Publisher first place award for best history book in the Great Lakes Region, and, in 2019, published "Where's Mine" by Judge Charles Kocoras. Dr. Samors publishes books through his company, Chicago's Books Press, an imprint of Chicago's Neighborhoods, Inc. He has a PhD and MALS from Northwestern University, an MA from Northern Illinois University and a BA from the University of Wisconsin–Madison. In 2010, Dr. Samors was selected as a Prominent Alumnus by the Sullivan High School Alumni Association. His latest books are "Corned Beef on Rye: Remembering Chicago's Jewish Delicatessens" which he co-authored with Eric Bronsky and "I Can't Wait Until Next Year: The Agony of Being a Cubs Fan" which he co-authored with Eric Sheinin. Both of these books were published in 2026.
