= Paul E. Tierney =

Business professor and investor (born 1943)

Paul E. Tierney, Jr. (born in 1943) is a business professor at Columbia University, a fund manager, and a venture capitalist at Aperture Venture Partners, and Fidus Partners. His investments have included stakes in the parent of United Airlines, US healthcare companies, and businesses in underdeveloped markets including Subsaharan Africa. He was named Chair of the Board of Advisors for Columbia's School of International and Public Affairs (SIPA) by Lisa Anderson, dean.

== Life ==
He graduated from Fenwick High School (Oak Park, Illinois) and magna cum laude from the University of Notre Dame in 1964. He served as a Peace Corps volunteer in rural Chile. He graduated from Harvard University, with an M.B.A. as a Baker Scholar, in 1968.

He was a senior vice president at White, Weld & Co. In 1978, he co-founded Gollust, Tierney & Oliver; they split up in 1990. He owned the Major League Soccer team, D.C. United, from 1994 to 2001.

He is married to Susan; they have three children.

== Philanthropy ==
Tierney has been chairman of TechnoServe, an international economic development organization working in Africa and Latin America, for two decades. Tierney encourages the use of private equity and venture capital to fund entrepreneurial firms in Africa, believing this funding approach "can be a superior alternative to the traditional development funds funneled through the likes of the World Bank."
