= Bobos in Paradise =

2000 book by David Brooks

Bobos in Paradise: The New Upper Class and How They Got There
- First edition
- Author: David Brooks
- Publisher: Simon & Schuster
- Publication date: May 3, 2000
- Pages: 288
- ISBN: 0-684-85378-7

Bobos in Paradise: The New Upper Class and How They Got There is a book by American conservative political commentator David Brooks. It was first published in 2000.

== Etymology ==
The word bobo, Brooks' most famously used term, is an abbreviated form of the words bourgeois and bohemian, suggesting a fusion of two distinct social classes (the counter-cultural, hedonistic and artistic bohemian, and the white collar, capitalist bourgeois). The term is used by Brooks to describe the 1990s successors of the yuppies. Often of the corporate upper class, they claim highly tolerant views of others, purchase expensive and exotic items, and believe American society to be meritocratic. The term is also widely used in France.

== Thesis ==
The thesis is that during the late 1970s a new establishment arose that represented a fusion between the bourgeois world of capitalist enterprise and the hippie values of the bohemian counterculture. He refers to these individuals as bobos, a portmanteau for "bourgeois bohemians".

== Description and behaviour ==
Bobos are noted for their aversion to conspicuous consumption while emphasizing the "necessities" of life. Brooks argues that they feel guilty in the way typical of the so-called "greed era" of the 1980s so they prefer to spend extravagantly on kitchens, showers, and other common facilities of everyday life. They "feel" for the labor and working class and often purchase American-made goods rather than less expensive imports from developing nations.

Bobos often relate to money as a means rather than an end; they do not disdain money but use it to achieve their ends rather than considering wealth as a desirable end in itself.

The New York Times noted in 2007 that, "'Made in the U.S.A.' used to be a label flaunted primarily by consumers in the Rust Belt and rural regions. Increasingly, it is a status symbol for cosmopolitan bobos, and it is being exploited by the marketers who cater to them."

== See also ==
- Champagne socialist
- Liberal elite
- Hipster (contemporary subculture)
- Limousine liberal
- The Social Animal, another book by David Brooks
- Status–income disequilibrium
- Stuff White People Like
